= Dream Theater discography =

Band discography

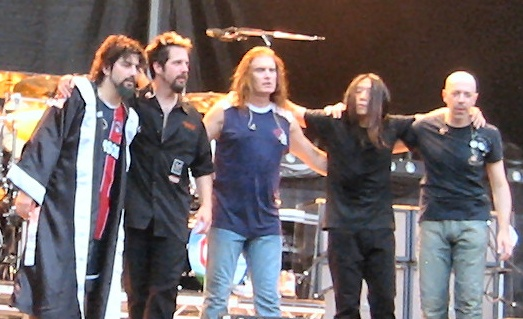
- Dream Theater in Paris, 2005 (From left to right: Mike Portnoy, John Petrucci, James LaBrie, John Myung, and Jordan Rudess)
- Studio albums: 16
- Extended plays: 1
- Live albums: 10
- Compilation albums: 1
- Singles: 9
- Video albums: 9
- Music videos: 21

The discography of Dream Theater, an American progressive metal band, consists of sixteen studio albums, one extended play, ten live albums, one compilation album, eight video albums, nine singles, and twenty-one music videos. The band was formed under the name Majesty by guitarist John Petrucci, bassist John Myung, and drummer Mike Portnoy while the three of them were attending Berklee College of Music in September 1985. The trio added keyboard player Kevin Moore and vocalist Chris Collins in order to complete their lineup. After the band released a demo entitled The Majesty Demos, Collins was replaced by Charlie Dominici in November 1987.

The group signed with Mechanic Records, and released its debut album When Dream and Day Unite in 1989. Before the album's release the group agreed to change their name to "Dream Theater", inspired by a now-demolished California movie theater. After firing Dominici, Dream Theater hired Canadian vocalist James LaBrie in 1991. LaBrie's debut album was Images and Words, which was the band's first and only gold-certified album by the Recording Industry Association of America (RIAA), having sold more than 500,000 copies. Moore left the group after the recording of 1994's Awake and was replaced by Derek Sherinian for the album's tour—he was later hired as a full member, appearing on the EP A Change of Seasons and the full album Falling Into Infinity. The double live album Once in a LIVEtime was released in 1998.

In 1999, Jordan Rudess was hired to replace Sherinian. Rudess's first work was Metropolis Pt. 2: Scenes from a Memory, a concept album that followed the story of a murder mystery. In 2002, the group released Six Degrees of Inner Turbulence, followed by Train of Thought in 2003, and Octavarium in 2005. Two more live albums were also released in this time period, and a new one, titled Score, was released for the band's 20th anniversary and featured the band backed by a 29-piece orchestra. It was followed a year later by their ninth studio album, Systematic Chaos. Dream Theater's tenth studio album, Black Clouds & Silver Linings, the band's second under Roadrunner Records; was released on June 23, 2009.

In September 2010, founding drummer Mike Portnoy announced that he was leaving the band. The band filmed a documentary ("The Spirit Carries On") of their search for a replacement who they found in Berklee professor Mike Mangini. In 2011, Dream Theater released their eleventh studio album A Dramatic Turn of Events and its eponymous album in 2013, their first album featuring composition from him. The band released their eleventh music video for "On the Backs of Angels" on October 4, 2011, a song which was subsequently nominated for a Grammy award.

On December 6, 2013, it was announced that the lead single from Dream Theater's self-titled album, "The Enemy Inside" was nominated for the Best Metal Performance Grammy Award. This is the band's second consecutive Grammy nomination. The band's thirteenth studio album, The Astonishing, was released in January 2016. It was followed with the release of their fourteenth studio album, Distance over Time, in February 2019.

On November 27, 2020, Dream Theater released their ninth live album, Distant Memories - Live in London. This was soon followed by the release of their 15th studio album, A View from the Top of the World, which won the band their first Grammy with its lead single, "The Alien."

On October 25, 2023, Dream Theater announced that original drummer Mike Portnoy was returning to the band.

Dream Theater has sold over two million records and DVDs in the United States and over 12 million records and DVDs throughout the world.

== Albums ==
=== Studio albums ===
Title	Album details	Peak chart positions										Sales	Certifications (sales thresholds)
Title	Album details	US	FIN	FRA	GER	JPN	NLD	NOR	SWE	SWI	UK	Sales	Certifications (sales thresholds)
When Dream and Day Unite	Released: March 6, 1989; Label: Mechanic, MCA; Format: CD, CS, LP	—	—	—	—	98	—	—	—	—	—	US: 37,092	
Images and Words	Released: July 7, 1992; Label: Atco; Format: CD, CS, LP	61	—	—	94	30	—	—	—	—	—	US: 604,000	RIAA: Gold; NVPI: Gold; RIAJ: Gold
Awake	Released: October 4, 1994; Label: East West; Format: CD, CS, LP	32	—	—	15	7	33	—	5	12	65	US: 271,570	RIAJ: Gold
Falling into Infinity	Released: September 23, 1997; Label: East West; Format: CD, CS, LP	52	5	42	9	16	16	20	14	43	163	US: 141,946	
Metropolis Pt. 2: Scenes from a Memory	Released: October 26, 1999; Label: Elektra; Format: CD, CS, LP	73	6	40	8	19	28	28	44	44	131	US: 123,275	
Six Degrees of Inner Turbulence	Released: January 29, 2002; Label: Elektra; Format: CD, CS, LP	46	2	17	12	15	14	16	12	52	—	US: 132,773	
Train of Thought	Released: November 11, 2003; Label: Elektra; Format: CD, CS, LP	53	9	24	16	12	21	9	9	44	146	US: 125,000	
Octavarium	Released: June 7, 2005; Label: Atlantic; Format: CD, CS, LP	36	2	18	15	10	9	9	4	25	72	US: 56,000	
Systematic Chaos	Released: June 5, 2007; Label: Roadrunner; Format: CD, DVD, LP, DL	19	3	17	7	12	2	3	5	14	25		
Black Clouds & Silver Linings	Released: June 23, 2009; Label: Roadrunner; Format: CD, LP, DL	6	1	9	3	8	3	7	3	9	23		
A Dramatic Turn of Events	Released: September 13, 2011; Label: Roadrunner; Format: CD, DVD, LP, DL	8	1	16	3	8	2	5	3	6	17		
Dream Theater	Released: September 24, 2013; Label: Roadrunner; Format: CD, DVD, LP, DL	7	2	18	4	10	4	4	5	5	15		
The Astonishing	Released: January 29, 2016; Label: Roadrunner; Format: CD, LP, DL	11	2	13	5	10	4	2	3	5	11		
Distance Over Time	Released: February 22, 2019; Label: Inside Out Music; Format: CD, LP, DL	24	4	16	1	10	3	3	4	1	12	JPN: 8,343	
A View from the Top of the World	Released: October 22, 2021; Label: Inside Out Music; Format: CD, LP, DL	52	1	30	2	8	3	13	21	3	21	JPN: 5,923	
Parasomnia	Released: February 7, 2025; Label: Inside Out Music; Format: CD, LP, DL	41	6	15	3	12	4	9	9	2	23		
"—" denotes releases that did not chart or were not released in that country.

=== Live albums ===
Title	Album details	Peak chart positions										Sales
Title	Album details	US	FIN	FRA	GER	ITA	JPN	NLD	NOR	SWI	UK	Sales
Live at the Marquee	Released: August 31, 1993; Label: Atco; Format: CD, CS, LP	—	—	—	—	—	36	57	—	—	—	
Once in a LIVEtime	Released: October 27, 1998; Label: Elektra; Format: CD, CS	157	—	—	59	—	49	58	—	—	—	US: 64,454
Live Scenes from New York	Released: September 11, 2001; Label: Elektra; Format: CD, CS, DVD	120	—	117	71	—	60	—	—	—	—	US: 28,555
Live at Budokan	Released: October 5, 2004; Label: Atlantic; Format: CD, DVD, BD, LP	—	—	—	91	—	63	91	—	—	—	
Score	Released: August 29, 2006; Label: Rhino; Format: CD, DVD, LP	—	36	—	40	14	50	34	18	81	94	
Chaos in Motion: 2007–2008	Released: September 30, 2008; Label: Roadrunner; Format: CD, DVD	—	22	—	37	—	—	—	—	—	—	
Live at Luna Park	Released: November 5, 2013; Label: Eagle Rock Entertainment; Format: CD, DVD, BD	—	—	—	17	—	—	52	—	—	—	
Breaking the Fourth Wall	Released: September 29, 2014; Label: Roadrunner; Format: CD, DVD, BD	—	—	—	28	—	—	—	—	—	—	
Distant Memories – Live in London	Released: November 27, 2020; Label: Inside Out Music; Format: CD, DVD, BD, LP	—	13	122	9	39	44	31	—	9	81	
Quarantième: Live à Paris	Released: November 28, 2025; Label: Inside Out Music; Format: CD, DVD, BD, LP	—	—	57	6	88	31	21	—	8	—	JPN: 1,881
"—" denotes releases that did not chart or were not released in that country.

=== Compilation albums ===
Title	Album details	Peak chart positions							
Title	Album details	US	GER	JPN	NLD	NOR	SWE	SWI	UK
Greatest Hit (...And 21 Other Pretty Cool Songs)	Released: April 1, 2008; Label: Rhino; Format: CD	122	77	28	52	12	46	62	113

== Extended plays ==
Title	EP details	Peak chart positions								Sales
Title	EP details	US	FIN	FRA	GER	JPN	NLD	SWE	UK	Sales
A Change of Seasons	Released: September 19, 1995; Label: East West; Format: CD, CS	58	17	44	50	16	39	13	88	US: 157,855

== Singles ==
=== Main singles ===
Year	Title	Peak chart positions				Album
Year	Title	US Sales	US Main.	JPN	UK	Album
1992	"Pull Me Under"	68	10	—	—	Images and Words
1993	"Another Day"	—	22	—	—	Images and Words
1994	"Lie"	—	38	—	175	Awake
1994	"The Silent Man"	—	—	—	—	Awake
1997	"Hollow Years"	—	—	—	—	Falling Into Infinity
2000	"Through Her Eyes"	—	—	72	—	Scenes from a Memory
2008	"Forsaken"	—	—	—	—	Systematic Chaos
2009	"Wither"	—	—	—	—	Black Clouds & Silver Linings
2014	"Illumination Theory" ^{[A]}	—	—	—	—	Dream Theater
2020	"The Holiday Spirit Carries On" ^{[B]}	—	—	—	—	—N/a
2025	"Night Terror"	—	—	—	—	Parasomnia
"—" denotes releases that did not chart or were not released in that country.

- A - Record Store Day exclusive.
- B - Released on December 1, 2020, for the help of the touring crew of Dream Theater because of the COVID-19 pandemic.

=== Promotional singles ===
Year	Title	Peak chart positions	Album
Year	Title	US Main.	Album
1989	"Status Seeker"	—	When Dream and Day Unite
1989	"Afterlife"	—	When Dream and Day Unite
1993	"Metropolis Pt. I"	—	Images and Words
1993	"Take the Time"	29	Images and Words
1994	"Caught in a Web"	—	Awake
1997	"Burning My Soul"	33	Falling into Infinity
1997	"You Not Me"	40	Falling into Infinity
1999	"Home"	—	Scenes from a Memory
2003	"As I Am"	—	Train of Thought
2005	"These Walls"	—	Octavarium
2007	"Constant Motion"	—	Systematic Chaos
2009	"A Rite of Passage"	—	Black Clouds & Silver Linings
2011	"On the Backs of Angels"	—	A Dramatic Turn of Events
2011	"Build Me Up, Break Me Down"	—	A Dramatic Turn of Events
2013	"The Enemy Inside"	—	Dream Theater
2013	"Along for the Ride"	—	Dream Theater
2014	"The Looking Glass"	—	Dream Theater
2016	"The Gift of Music"	—	The Astonishing
2016	"Our New World"	—	The Astonishing
2018	"Untethered Angel"	—	Distance over Time
2019	"Fall into the Light"	—	Distance over Time
2019	"Paralyzed"	—	Distance over Time
2019	"Barstool Warrior"	—	Distance over Time
2019	"At Wit's End"	—	Distance over Time
2021	"The Alien"	—	A View from the Top of the World
2021	"Invisible Monster"	—	A View from the Top of the World
2021	"Awaken the Master"	—	A View from the Top of the World
"—" denotes releases that did not chart or were not released in that country.

== Other appearances ==
Year	Title	Description			
Year	Title	Description	2006	Gigantour	Dream Theater performed The Glass Prison and Panic Attack on this live CD/DVD release of the 2005 Gigantour.
Year	Title	Description	2010	Raw Dog	An instrumental track written for the Blood & Metal EP which accompanies the PlayStation 3 game God of War III. It is notable as the last song Mike Portnoy recorded with Dream Theater until his return to the band in 2023.
2017	Xanadu	Included on the 40th Anniversary reissue of A Farewell to Kings by Rush.			

== Videos ==
=== Video albums ===
Title	Video details	Peak chart positions								Certifications
Title	Video details	US	AUT	FIN	GER	ITA	NLD	JPN	SWE	Certifications
Images and Words: Live in Tokyo	Released: November 16, 1993; Label: Atlantic, East West; Format: VHS, [VCD (Indonesian Only)]	13	—	—	—	—	—	—	—	
5 Years in a Livetime	Released: October 27, 1998; Label: East West; Format: VHS	—	—	—	—	—	—	—	—	
Metropolis 2000: Scenes from New York	Released: March 20, 2001; Label: Elektra; Format: DVD, VHS	5	—	2	—	—	—	22	5	RIAA: Gold
Live at Budokan	Released: October 5, 2004; Label: Atlantic; Format: DVD, BD	4	—	3	91	—	—	24	3	RIAA: Platinum
Images and Words: Live in Tokyo / 5 Years in a Livetime	Released: June 1, 2004; Label: Rhino Home Video; Format: DVD	—	—	—	—	—	—	—	—	RIAA: Platinum
Score	Released: August 29, 2006; Label: Rhino; Format: DVD	1	3	1	40	2	—	28	1	RIAA: Platinum; AUS: Gold
Chaos in Motion: 2007–2008	Released: September 30, 2008; Label: Roadrunner; Format: DVD, CD	2	—	—	37	1	3	38	—	
Live at Luna Park	Released: November 5, 2013; Label: Roadrunner; Format: DVD, CD, BD	1	—	1	17	5	11	74	1	RIAA: Gold
Breaking the Fourth Wall	Released: September 30, 2014; Label: Roadrunner; Format: DVD, CD, BD	—	—	1	28	2	2	94	1	
Distant Memories – Live in London	Released: November 27, 2020; Label: Inside Out Music; Format: DVD, CD, BD	—	—	—	—	—	—	—	—	
"—" denotes releases that did not chart or were not released in that country.

=== Music videos ===
Year	Title	Director
1992	"Pull Me Under"	David Roth
1993	"Take the Time"	Chris Painter
1993	"Another Day"	Chris Painter
1994	"Lie"	Ralph Ziman
1994	"The Silent Man"	Pamela Birkhead
1997	"Hollow Years"	Axel Baur
2007	"Constant Motion"	Andrew Bennett
2008	"Forsaken"	Yasufumi Soejima
2009	"A Rite of Passage"	Ramon Boutviseth
2009	"Wither"	Ramon Boutviseth
2011	"On the Backs of Angels"	Ramon Boutviseth
2013	"The Enemy Inside"	Bill Fishman
2013	"Metropolis Pt. 1" (Luna Park)	Mike Leonard
2014	"The Looking Glass"	Ramon Boutviseth
2014	"Enigma Machine"	Maria Spivakova
2014	"Metropolis Pt. 2 Encore" (Breaking the Fourth Wall)	Pierre & François Lamoreux
2016	"The Gift of Music"	Wes Teshome
2016	"Our New World"	Filo Baietti
2021	"The Alien"	Wayne Joyner
2021	"Invisible Monster"	William "Wombat" Felch
2021	"Awaken the Master"	Wayne Joyner
2022	"Transcending Time"	Wayne Joyner
2023	"Answering the Call"	Wayne Joyner
2024	"Night Terror"	Mike Leonard
2025	"Midnight Messiah"	Mike Leonard
2025	"Bend The Clock"	Erez Bader

== Fanclub releases ==
Year	Title	Format	Description
1996	International Fanclub Christmas CD	CD	Exclusive cover songs plus messages from the band.
1998	Once in a LIVEtime Outtakes	CD	Unused songs from the live recordings for the Once in a LIVEtime album.
1999	Cleaning Out the Closet	CD	A compilation of previously unreleased studio recordings.
2000	Scenes from a World Tour	CD	Live recordings from the World tour for the Scenes from a Memory album.
2001	Four Degrees of Radio Edits	CD	4 radio edits of songs from the Six Degrees of Inner Turbulence album.
2002	Taste the Memories	CD	Live recordings from 1992 and 1993 in Japan, plus a full version of A Change of Seasons in New York.
2002	The Atco Demos	CD	3-track demo released to celebrate the tenth anniversary of the Images and Words album.
2003	Graspop Festival 2002	CD	Full set from the Graspop Festival in Belgium in 2002.
2004	A Sort of Homecoming	CD	Set of live recordings in United States and Canada in 2004.
2005	A Walk Beside the Band	DVD	Backstage interviews with the band.
2006	Romavarium	DVD	A performance of the entire Octavarium album filmed live in Rome 2005.
2007	Images and Words 15th Anniversary Performance	CD	Live recording of Images & Words in Bonn, Germany in 2007.
2008	Progressive Nation 2008	CD	Live recording at Terminal 5 in New York in 2008.
2013	Happy Holidays 2013	Digital	Compilation of live tracks recorded in 2011 and 2012.

== Official bootlegs ==
Year	Title	Category
2003	The Majesty Demos 1985–1986	Demo series
2003	Los Angeles, California 5/18/98	Live series
2003	The Making of Scenes from a Memory	Studio series
2004	When Dream and Day Unite Demos 1987–1989	Demo series
2004	Tokyo, Japan 10/28/95	Live series
2004	Master of Puppets	Cover series
2005	Images and Words Demos 1989–1991	Demo series
2005	The Number of the Beast	Cover series
2005	When Dream and Day Reunite	Live series
2006	Awake Demos 1994	Demo series
2006	Old Bridge, New Jersey 12/14/96	Live series
2006	The Dark Side of the Moon	Cover series
2007	New York City 3/4/93	Live series
2007	Bucharest, Romania – 7/4/02	Live series
2007	Falling into Infinity Demos 1996–1997	Demo series
2007	Made in Japan	Cover series
2009	The Making of Falling into Infinity	Studio series
2009	Train of Thought Instrumental Demos 2003	Demo series
2009	Uncovered 2003–2005	Cover series
2009	Santiago, Chile – 12/6/05	Live series
2021	Images and Words: Live in Japan, 2017	Live series
2021	A Dramatic Tour of Events – Select Board Mixes	Live series
2022	...And Beyond – Live in Japan 2017	Live series
2022	Live in Berlin, 2019	Live series
2022	Live at Wacken, 2015	Live series
2023	Live at Madison Square Garden, 2010	Live series
2023	Distance over Time Demos (2018)	Demo series
2026	Live in Tokyo, 2010	Live series

== See also ==
- List of Dream Theater songs
