= List of songs recorded by Dream Theater =

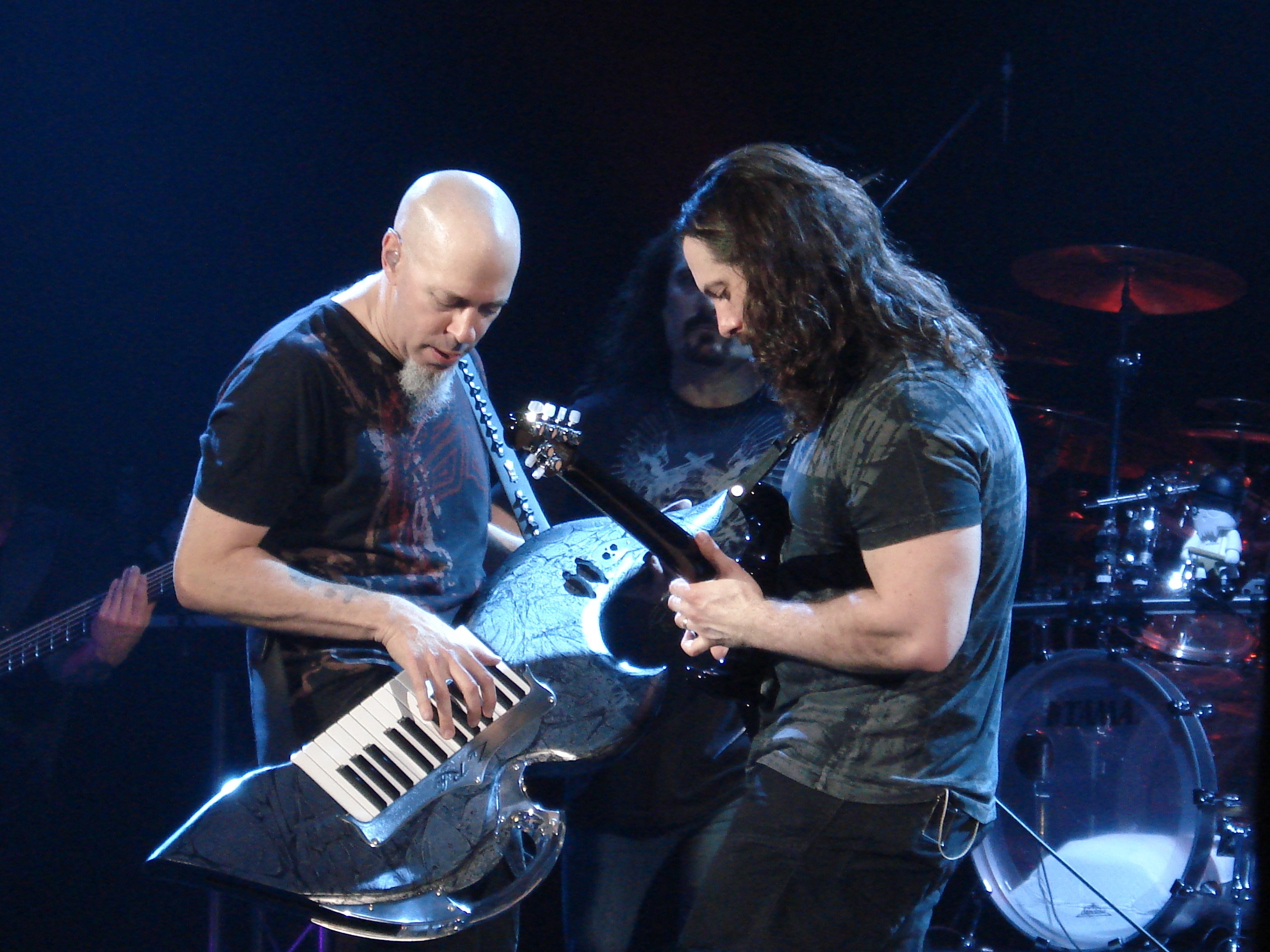
Jordan Rudess and John Petrucci performing in Argentina on March 3, 2008

This is a complete list of songs by American progressive metal band Dream Theater. Dream Theater was formed in 1985 by guitarist John Petrucci, bassist John Myung, and drummer Mike Portnoy. The band's current line-up consists of Petrucci, Myung, Portnoy, keyboardist Jordan Rudess, and vocalist James LaBrie. As of 2025, Dream Theater has released sixteen studio albums.

== List ==
Title	Year	Album	Lyricist	Length	Notes
"2285 Entr'acte"	2016	The Astonishing	Instrumental	2:20	
"6:00"	1994	Awake	Kevin Moore	5:31	
"A Better Life"	2016	The Astonishing	John Petrucci	4:39	
"A Broken Man"	2024	Parasomnia	James LaBrie	8:30	
"A Change of Seasons"	1995	A Change of Seasons	Mike Portnoy	23:09	Originally written in 1989 and supposed to appear on Images and Words, but cut due to the album already being too long. The song was re-worked and released on the EP A Change of Seasons. The original version was never officially released.
"A Crack in the Mirror"	1994	—N/a	Instrumental	1:05	Extended intro added to "The Mirror". Only played live during the Waking Up the World Tour (1994–95) and never officially released.
"A Fortune in Lies"	1989	When Dream and Day Unite	John Petrucci	5:12	
"A Life Left Behind"	2016	The Astonishing	John Petrucci	5:49	
"A Mind Beside Itself: I. Erotomania"	1994	Awake	Instrumental	6:44	
"A Mind Beside Itself: II. Voices"	1994	Awake	John Petrucci	9:53	
"A Mind Beside Itself: III. The Silent Man"	1994	Awake	John Petrucci	3:47	Released as a single. A music video was made for the song.
"A New Beginning"	2016	The Astonishing	John Petrucci	7:40	
"A Nightmare to Remember"	2009	Black Clouds & Silver Linings	John Petrucci	16:10	
"A Rite of Passage"	2009	Black Clouds & Silver Linings	John Petrucci	8:36	Released as a single. A music video was made for the song.
"A Savior in the Square"	2016	The Astonishing	John Petrucci	4:13	
"A Tempting Offer"	2016	The Astonishing	John Petrucci	4:19	
"A View from the Top of the World"	2021	A View from the Top of the World	John Petrucci	20:24	
"A Vision"	1986	Majesty Demos	Kevin Moore	11:24	Two versions exist for this song: The original version released on The Majesty Demos (11:24).; A reworked version with Charlie Dominici on vocals. It appears on the When Dream and Day Unite Demos released as "A Vision 89" (7:10).
"Act of Faythe"	2016	The Astonishing	John Petrucci	5:00	
"Afterlife"	1989	When Dream and Day Unite	Charlie Dominici	5:26	A remixed version was released as a promo single. This song was written while Chris Collins was in the band and originally featured his lyrics and a different vocal melody, although the song title was the same.
"Along for the Ride"	2013	Dream Theater	John Petrucci	4:45	Released as a single.
"Anna Lee"	1997	Falling Into Infinity	James LaBrie	5:51	
"Another Day"	1992	Images and Words	John Petrucci	4:23	Released as a single. A music video was made for the song.
"Another Hand"	1993	Live at the Marquee	Instrumental	2:12	Instrumental that connected "Another Day" and "The Killing Hand" when performed live in 1992 and 1993. Also was used as the intro to "The Killing Hand" on later tours.
"Another Won"	1986	Majesty Demos	John Petrucci	5:27	Appears on the Score live album.
"Answering the Call"	2021	A View from the Top of the World	James LaBrie	7:35	
"Are We Dreaming?"	2025	Parasomnia	Instrumental	1:28	
"As I Am"	2003	Train of Thought	John Petrucci	7:47	Released as a single.
"Astonishing"	2016	The Astonishing	John Petrucci	5:51	
"At Wit's End"	2019	Distance over Time	James LaBrie	9:20	
"Awake Jam"	1994	—N/a	Instrumental	5:39	Improvisation jam. Only played live during the Waking Up the World Tour (1994–95) and never officially released.
"Awaken the Master"	2021	A View from the Top of the World	John Myung	9:47	
"Barfbag"	1993	—N/a	Instrumental	—N/a	Improvisation jam. Only played live in the autumn of 1993 and never officially released.
"Barstool Warrior"	2019	Distance over Time	John Petrucci	6:43	
"Begin Again"	2016	The Astonishing	John Petrucci	3:54	
"Behind the Veil"	2013	Dream Theater	John Petrucci	6:52	
"Bend the Clock"	2025	Parasomnia	James LaBrie	7:24	
"Beneath the Surface"	2011	A Dramatic Turn of Events	John Petrucci	5:26	
"Blind Faith"	2002	Six Degrees of Inner Turbulence	James LaBrie	10:21	
"Bombay Vindaloo"	1993	Live at the Marquee	Instrumental	6:48	Improvisation jam. Only played live.
"Breaking All Illusions"	2011	A Dramatic Turn of Events	John Myung and John Petrucci	12:25	
"Bridges in the Sky"	2011	A Dramatic Turn of Events	John Petrucci	11:01	
"Brother, Can You Hear Me?"	2016	The Astonishing	John Petrucci	5:11	
"Build Me Up, Break Me Down"	2011	A Dramatic Turn of Events	John Petrucci	6:59	Released as a single.
"Burning My Soul"	1997	Falling into Infinity	Mike Portnoy	5:29	The original demo version is 9 minutes long and included a mellow introduction and most of what became Hell's Kitchen.
"Caught in a Web"	1994	Awake	James LaBrie and John Petrucci	5:28	Released as a promo single.
"Chosen"	2016	The Astonishing	John Petrucci	4:32	
"Constant Motion"	2007	Systematic Chaos	Mike Portnoy	6:55	Released as a single. A music video was made for this song.
"Cover My Eyes"	1997	Falling into Infinity Demos	John Petrucci	3:23	Cut from the final album. A live acoustic version appears on Once in a LIVEtime.
"Cry for Freedom"	1986	When Dream and Day Unite Demos	Chris Collins	6:46	While this song had lyrics, and the song was performed live with Chris, the only "proper" recordings of this song that exist are instrumental demos.
"Dead Asleep"	2025	Parasomnia	John Petrucci	11:06	
"Descent of the NOMACS"	2016	The Astonishing	NOMACS Instrumental	1:10	
"Digital Discord"	2016	The Astonishing	NOMACS Instrumental	0:47	
"Disappear"	2002	Six Degrees of Inner Turbulence	James LaBrie	6:46	
"Don't Look Past Me"	1992	Images and Words Demos	Kevin Moore	6:25	Cut from the final album. Never officially released. James LaBrie re-recorded vocals for this song in 1999 which were added to the original 1990 demo for a fanclub CD release.
"Dystopian Overture"	2016	The Astonishing	Instrumental	4:50	
"Endless Sacrifice"	2003	Train of Thought	John Petrucci	11:24	
"Enigma Machine"	2013	Dream Theater	Instrumental	6:01	
"Eve"	1992	The Silent Man, Awake (2-disc Japanese pressing)	Instrumental	5:10	Initially performed live in 1993. Recorded during the Awake sessions but cut from the final album. Appears as a B-side on The Silent Man single, as well as on a two-disc Japanese pressing of Awake.
"Fall into the Light"	2019	Distance over Time	John Myung and John Petrucci	7:04	Second single for Distance over Time
"False Awakening Suite"	2013	Dream Theater	Instrumental	2:42	
"Far from Heaven"	2011	A Dramatic Turn of Events	James LaBrie	3:56	
"Forsaken"	2007	Systematic Chaos	John Petrucci	5:35	Released as a single. A music video was made for the song.
"Heaven's Cove"	2016	The Astonishing	John Petrucci	4:19	
"Hell's Kitchen"	1997	Falling into Infinity	Instrumental	4:16	Most of this song was originally an instrumental part of "Burning My Soul".
"Hollow Years"	1997	Falling into Infinity	John Petrucci	5:53	Released as a single. A music video was made for the song
"Honor Thy Father"	2003	Train of Thought	Mike Portnoy	10:14	
"Hymn of a Thousand Voices"	2016	The Astonishing	John Petrucci	3:38	
"I Walk Beside You"	2005	Octavarium	John Petrucci	4:29	
"Illumination Theory"	2013	Dream Theater	John Petrucci	22:17	
"In the Arms of Morpheus"	2025	Parasomnia	Instrumental	5:23	
"In the Name of God"	2003	Train of Thought	John Petrucci	14:16	
"In the Presence of Enemies"	2007	Systematic Chaos	John Petrucci	25:38	Split in two parts: Part 1: 9:00; Part 2: 16:38
"Invisible Monster"	2021	A View from the Top of the World	John Petrucci	6:31	Released as a promo single.
"Innocence Faded"	1994	Awake	John Petrucci	5:42	
"Just Let Me Breathe"	1997	Falling into Infinity	Mike Portnoy	5:28	
"Learning to Live"	1992	Images and Words	John Myung	11:30	
"Lie"	1994	Awake	Kevin Moore	6:33	A music video was made for the song
"Lifting Shadows Off a Dream"	1994	Awake	John Myung	6:05	
"Light Fuse and Get Away"	1989	When Dream and Day Unite	Kevin Moore	7:23	
"Lines in the Sand"	1997	Falling into Infinity	John Petrucci	12:05	
"Lord Nafaryus"	2016	The Astonishing	John Petrucci	3:28	
"Losing Faythe"	2016	The Astonishing	John Petrucci	4:13	
"Lost Not Forgotten"	2011	A Dramatic Turn of Events	John Petrucci	10:11	
"Machine Chatter"	2016	The Astonishing	NOMACS Instrumental	1:03	
"March of the Tyrant"	1986	Majesty Demos	John Myung	5:34	
"Metropolis Pt. I: The Miracle and the Sleeper"	1992	Images and Words	John Petrucci	9:32	
"Metropolis Pt. II"	1996	Falling into Infinity Demos	Instrumental (lyrics never written)	21:25	Original epic sequel to Metropolis pt. I and intended for the Falling into Infinity album. Lyrics were never written and this version of the song was abandoned once they decided to expand it into a full album, which became Metropolis Pt. 2: Scenes from a Memory
"Midnight Messiah"	2025	Parasomnia	Mike Portnoy	7:58	
"Misunderstood"	2002	Six Degrees of Inner Turbulence	John Petrucci	9:32	
"Moment of Betrayal"	2016	The Astonishing	John Petrucci	6:11	Released as a promo single.
"Moon Bubbles"	1992	—N/a	Instrumental	—N/a	Improvisation jam on guitar and bass. Only played live and never officially released.
"My Last Farewell"	2016	The Astonishing	John Petrucci	3:44	
"Never Enough"	2005	Octavarium	Mike Portnoy	6:46	
"New Millennium"	1997	Falling into Infinity	Mike Portnoy	8:20	
"Night Terror"	2024	Parasomnia	John Petrucci	9:55	First single for Parasomnia
"Octavarium"	2005	Octavarium	James LaBrie, John Petrucci, and Mike Portnoy	24:00	
"Only a Matter of Time"	1989	When Dream and Day Unite	Kevin Moore	6:35	
"On the Backs of Angels"	2011	A Dramatic Turn of Events	John Petrucci	8:42	Released as a single. A music video was made for the song.
"Our New World"	2016	The Astonishing	John Petrucci	4:12	Featuring Lizzy Hale on vocals. Released as a promo single. A music video was made for the song.
"Out of Reach"	2019	Distance over Time	James LaBrie	4:04	
"Outcry"	2011	A Dramatic Turn of Events	John Petrucci	11:24	
"Pale Blue Dot"	2019	Distance over Time	John Petrucci	8:25	
"Panic Attack"	2005	Octavarium	John Petrucci	8:13	
"Paralyzed"	2019	Distance over Time	John Petrucci	4:17	Third single for Distance over Time
"Peruvian Skies"	1997	Falling into Infinity	John Petrucci	6:43	
"Power Down"	2016	The Astonishing	NOMACS Instrumental	1:25	
"Prophets of War"	2007	Systematic Chaos	James LaBrie	6:00	
"Pull Me Under"	1992	Images and Words	Kevin Moore	8:14	Released as a promo single. A music video was made for the song.
"Puppies on Acid"	1994	Awake sessions	Instrumental	1:24	Intro part of "The Mirror", and also the working title of this song. Appears on Once in a LIVEtime
"Raise the Knife"	1997	Falling into Infinity Demos, Score	Mike Portnoy	11:40	Cut from the final album. A live version appears on the Score live album.
"Ravenskill"	2016	The Astonishing	John Petrucci	6:01	
"Raw Dog"	2010	God of War: Blood & Metal	Instrumental	7:33	Last song to be recorded with Mike Portnoy until his reunion with the band in 2023
"Repentance"	2007	Systematic Chaos	Mike Portnoy	10:43	Part four of the Twelve-step Suite.
"Room 137"	2019	Distance over Time	Mike Mangini	4:23	
"S2N"	2019	Distance over Time	John Myung and John Petrucci	6:21	
"Sacrificed Sons"	2005	Octavarium	James LaBrie	10:42	
"Scarred"	1994	Awake	John Petrucci	10:59	
"Scene Eight: The Spirit Carries On"	1999	Metropolis Pt. 2: Scenes from a Memory	John Petrucci	6:38	
"Scene Five: Through Her Eyes"	1999	Metropolis Pt. 2: Scenes from a Memory	John Petrucci	5:29	Released as a single.
"Scene Four: Beyond This Life"	1999	Metropolis Pt. 2: Scenes from a Memory	John Petrucci	11:22	
"Scene Nine: Finally Free	1999	Metropolis Pt. 2: Scenes from a Memory	Mike Portnoy	11:59	
"Scene One: Regression"	1999	Metropolis Pt. 2: Scenes from a Memory	John Petrucci	2:06	
"Scene Seven: I. The Dance of Eternity"	1999	Metropolis Pt. 2: Scenes from a Memory	Instrumental	6:13	
"Scene Seven: II. One Last Time"	1999	Metropolis Pt. 2: Scenes from a Memory	James LaBrie	3:46	
"Scene Six: Home"	1999	Metropolis Pt. 2: Scenes from a Memory	Mike Portnoy	12:53	Released as a promo single.
"Scene Three: I. Through My Words	1999	Metropolis Pt. 2: Scenes from a Memory	John Petrucci	1:02	
"Scene Three: II. Fatal Tragedy"	1999	Metropolis Pt. 2: Scenes from a Memory	John Myung	6:49	
"Scene Two: I. Overture 1928"	1999	Metropolis Pt. 2: Scenes from a Memory	Instrumental	3:37	
"Scene Two: II. Strange Deja Vu"	1999	Metropolis Pt. 2: Scenes from a Memory	Mike Portnoy	5:12	
"Six Degrees of Inner Turbulence"	2002	Six Degrees of Inner Turbulence	John Petrucci and Mike Portnoy	42:02	Divided into eight parts : "I. Overture" (6:50); "II. About to Crash" (5:50); "III. War Inside My Head" (2:08); "IV. The Test That Stumped Them All" (5:03); "V. Goodnight Kiss" (6:17); "VI. Solitary Shell" (5:47); "VII. About to Crash (Reprise)" (4:04); "VIII. Losing Time/Grand Finale" (5:59)
"Sleeping Giant"	2021	A View from the Top of the World	John Petrucci	10:05	
"Slow Motion"	1993	—N/a	Instrumental	—N/a	Improvisation jam. Only played live in January 1993 and never officially released.
"Space-Dye Vest"	1994	Awake	Kevin Moore	7:29	
"Speak to Me"	1997	Falling into Infinity Demos	James LaBrie	6:25	6' MINI CD. Appears on Falling Into Infinity - Japanese version - EastWest Records America – AMCY-2315-S
"Status Seeker"	1989	When Dream and Day Unite	Charlie Dominici and John Petrucci	4:17	A remixed version was released as a promo single.
"Stream of Consciousness"	2003	Train of Thought	Instrumental	11:16	
"Surrender to Reason"	2013	Dream Theater	John Myung	6:34	
"Surrounded"	1992	Images and Words	Kevin Moore	5:30	
"Take Away My Pain"	1997	Falling into Infinity	John Petrucci	6:03	
"Take the Time"	1992	Images and Words	John Petrucci, Mike Portnoy, John Myung and Kevin Moore	8:21	Released as a promo single. A music video was made for the song.
"The Alien"	2021	A View from the Top of the World	James LaBrie	9:32	Released as a promo single.
"The Answer"	2016	The Astonishing	John Petrucci	1:52	
"The Answer Lies Within"	2005	Octavarium	John Petrucci	5:33	
"The Best of Times"	2009	Black Clouds & Silver Linings	Mike Portnoy	13:09	
"The Bigger Picture"	2013	Dream Theater	John Petrucci	7:40	Released as a single.
"The Count of Tuscany"	2009	Black Clouds & Silver Linings	John Petrucci	19:16	
"The Dark Eternal Night"	2007	Systematic Chaos	John Petrucci	8:53	
"The Enemy Inside"	2013	Dream Theater	John Petrucci	6:17	Released as a single. A music video was made for the song.
"The Gift of Music"	2016	The Astonishing	John Petrucci	4:00	Released as a promo single. A music video was made for the song.
"The Glass Prison"	2002	Six Degrees of Inner Turbulence	Mike Portnoy	13:53	Part one of the Twelve-step Suite.
"The Great Debate"	2002	Six Degrees of Inner Turbulence	John Petrucci	13:46	
"The Holiday Spirit Carries On"	2020	The Holiday Spirit Carries On		5:14	Released on December 1, 2020 for the help of the touring crew of Dream Theater because of the COVID-19 pandemic.
"The Hovering Sojourn"	2016	The Astonishing	NOMACS Instrumental	0:27	
"The Killing Hand"	1989	When Dream and Day Unite	John Petrucci	8:41	
"The Looking Glass"	2013	Dream Theater	John Petrucci	4:53	Released as a single. A music video was made for the song.
"The Ministry of Lost Souls"	2007	Systematic Chaos	John Petrucci	14:57	
"The Mirror"	1994	Awake	Mike Portnoy	6:45	
"The Path That Divides"	2016	The Astonishing	John Petrucci	5:09	
"The Ones Who Help to Set the Sun"	1989	When Dream and Day Unite	John Petrucci	8:05	
"The Road to Revolution"	2016	The Astonishing	John Petrucci	3:35	
"The Root of All Evil"	2005	Octavarium	Mike Portnoy	8:25	Part three of the Twelve-step Suite.
"The Shadow Man Incident"	2025	Parasomnia	John Petrucci	19:32	
"The Shattered Fortress"	2009	Black Clouds & Silver Linings	Mike Portnoy	12:49	Part five of the Twelve-step Suite.
"The Walking Shadow"	2016	The Astonishing	John Petrucci	2:58	
"The Way It Used to Be"	1997	Hollow Years, Falling Into Infinity Demos	James LaBrie	7:47	Cut from the final album. Appears on the Hollow Years single.
"The X Aspect"	2016	The Astonishing	John Petrucci	4:13	
"The Ytse Jam"	1989	When Dream and Day Unite	Instrumental	5:46	
"These Walls"	2005	Octavarium	John Petrucci	7:36	
"This Dying Soul"	2003	Train of Thought	Mike Portnoy	11:27	Part two of the Twelve-step Suite.
"This Is the Life"	2011	A Dramatic Turn of Events	John Petrucci	6:57	
"Three Days"	2016	The Astonishing	John Petrucci	3:44	
"To Live Forever"	1992	Lie, Greatest Hit (...and 21 Other Pretty Cool Songs), Images and Words Demos	John Petrucci, Kevin Moore	4:26	Originally written in 1987. 4 versions exist : A demo from 1988 with Charlie Dominici singing. Never officially released.; A demo recorded in 1990. Separate versions featuring the vocals of John Hendricks and Steve Stone (with the same backing track) were released on the Images and Words Demos official bootleg.; A high quality demo recorded before the Images and Words sessions in 1991. Released on the Images and Words Demos official bootleg.; A version recorded during the Awake sessions. Appears on the Lie single and on the Greatest Hit (...and 21 Other Pretty Cool Songs) compilation album.
"Trial of Tears"	1997	Falling into Infinity	John Myung	13:06	
"Two Far"	1986	Majesty Demos	Kevin Moore	5:25	
"Transcending Time"	2021	A View from the Top of the World	John Petrucci	6:25	
"Under a Glass Moon"	1992	Images and Words	John Petrucci	7:03	
"Untethered Angel"	2018	Distance over Time	John Petrucci	6:14	First single for Distance over Time
"Vacant"	2003	Train of Thought	James LaBrie	2:57	
"Viper King"	2019	Distance over Time	James LaBrie	4:00	
"Vital Star"	1986	Majesty Demos	Kevin Moore	5:44	
"Wait for Sleep"	1992	Images and Words	Kevin Moore	2:31	
"When Your Time Has Come"	2016	The Astonishing	John Petrucci	4:19	
"Where Are You Now"	1997	Falling into Infinity Demos	John Petrucci	7:27	Cut from the final album. Never officially released.
"Whispers on the Wind"	2016	The Astonishing	John Petrucci	1:37	
"Wither"	2009	Black Clouds & Silver Linings	John Petrucci	5:25	Released as the Wither EP. A music video was made for the song. A version with John Petrucci singing (with the same album backing track) also exists, as does a completely separate version on piano and vocals only.
"You Not Me"	1997	Falling into Infinity	John Petrucci and Desmond Child	4:58	Heavily re-worked version of "You Or Me".
"You Or Me"	1997	Hollow Years, Falling Into Infinity sessions	John Petrucci	6:28	Original version of "You Not Me". Appears on the Hollow Years single.
"Your Majesty"	1986	Majesty Demos	John Petrucci	3:45	

== Medleys ==
Title	Appearances	Notes
"Caught in a New Millennium"	Live Scenes from New York	Mashup of "Caught in a Web" and "New Millennium". Played in 2000 during the Metropolis 2000 tour.
"Caught in Alice's Nine-Inch Tool Garden (Caught in a Web '96)"	Old Bridge, New Jersey – 12/14/96 (CD) official bootleg Live Bonus Tracks (Promotional CD)	Not a true medley, but rather a reworked version of "Caught in a Web", influenced by Alice in Chains, Nine Inch Nails, Tool and Soundgarden. Played around December 1996, and April & September 1997. Served as the initial basis for what later became the song "New Millennium"
Unnamed medley, labeled by fans as "Falling Into a Change of Awake"	—N/a	Selections from the tracks "Puppies on Acid", "A Change of Seasons", "Just Let Me Breathe", Liquid Tension Experiment's "Acid Rain", "Caught in a Web" and "New Millenium". Played in 2000 during the Metropolis 2000 tour.
"Instrumedley"	Live at Budokan	Selections from the tracks "The Dance of Eternity", "Metropolis Pt. 1: The Miracle and the Sleeper", "Erotomania", "A Change of Seasons", "Ytse Jam", "Hell's Kitchen" and songs by Liquid Tension Experiment. Played during the World Tourbulence and Train of Thought tours.
"Schmedley Wilcox"	Chaos in Motion 2007-2008	Selections from the tracks "Trial of Tears", "Finally Free", "Learning to Live", "In the Name of God" and "Octavarium". Played as an encore song for most of the shows of the Chaos in Motion tour.
"The Big Medley"	A Change of Seasons	Mashup of the following covers : In the Flesh? (Pink Floyd); Carry On Wayward Son (Kansas); Bohemian Rhapsody (Queen); Lovin', Touchin', Squeezin' (Journey); Cruise Control (Dixie Dregs); Turn it on Again (Genesis); Played only at the uncovered fan club gig at the Ronnie Scott's Jazz Club in London (England), on January 31, 1995.
"When Images and Words Unite"	Through Her Eyes single	Selection from the tracks "Pull Me Under", "Under a Glass Moon", "A Fortune in Lies", "Only a Matter of Time" and "Take the Time". Played during the Scenes from a Memory and Metropolis 2000 tours.
