= Out of Reach =

Out of Reach may refer to:

- Out of Reach (film), a 2004 American film starring Steven Seagal
- Out of Reach (album), a 1978 album by Can
- "Out of Reach" (song), a 2001 song by Gabrielle
- "Out of Reach", a 1999 song by The Get Up Kids from the album Something to Write Home About
- "Out of Reach", a 2019 song by Dream Theater from the album Distance over Time

== See also ==
- Just Out of Reach (disambiguation)
- "Out of My Reach", a song by Cass Fox
- Reach Out (disambiguation)
