= A Sort of Homecoming =

A Sort of Homecoming may refer to:

- "A Sort of Homecoming" (song), a 1984 recording by Irish rock band U2
- A Sort of Homecoming, a 2004 album by American progressive metal band Dream Theater
- "A Sort of Homecoming" (Friday Night Lights), a 2009 episode of the sports drama television series
- A Sort of Homecoming (film), a 2015 American drama directed by Maria Burton
- Bono & The Edge: A Sort of Homecoming, with Dave Letterman, a 2023 television documentary film promoting the album Songs of Surrender
