= A View from the Top of the World =

2021 studio album by Dream Theater

Studio album by Dream Theater
- Released: October 22, 2021
- Recorded: October 2020 – March 2021
- Studios: DTHQ, Long Island, New York
- Genre: Progressive metal
- Length: 70:19
- Label: Inside Out
- Producer: John Petrucci

Dream Theater chronology
Distant Memories – Live in London (2020)	A View from the Top of the World (2021)	Parasomnia (2025)

Singles from A View from the Top of the World
- 1. "The Alien" Released: August 13, 2021; 2. "Invisible Monster" Released: September 22, 2021; 3. "Awaken the Master" Released: December 00, 2021; 4. "Transcending Time" Released: January 00, 2022; 5. "Answering the Call" Released: June 15, 2023

Professional ratings
Review scores
Source	Rating
AllMusic	4/5 stars
Blabbermouth.net	8/10
Classic Rock	2.5/5 stars
Consequence	B+
Metal Hammer	5.5/7 stars
Metal Injection	8/10
RockNLoad	9/10

A View from the Top of the World is the fifteenth studio album by American progressive metal band Dream Theater, released on October 22, 2021. It is their first album to be recorded at their own studio, DTHQ (Dream Theater Headquarters) as well as their first since Black Clouds & Silver Linings (2009) to include fewer than nine tracks, the first since Dream Theater (2013) both to contain a track of at least ten minutes in length and to end with the longest track. It is also Dream Theater's last album to feature drummer Mike Mangini, who left the band in October 2023 upon the return of original drummer Mike Portnoy. The first song in the album, "The Alien", won a Grammy Award for Best Metal Performance in 2022.

== Background and production ==
The band began work on A View from the Top of the World about a year after the release of their then-latest album, Distance over Time (2019). Metal Addicts reported in April 2020 that Dream Theater (who had recently rescheduled and eventually cancelled their touring plans due to the COVID-19 pandemic) was planning to work on a new album in 2021. On the direction of the album, guitarist John Petrucci stated in an August 2020 interview with Ultimate Guitar: "The eight-string project with Ernie Ball Music Man is something we are working on and hoping to have developed as this year goes on. I'm hoping that on the next Dream Theater record I'll be able to explore that." Petrucci later confirmed, during an October 2020 interview with Revolver that, within the next few weeks, the band would be heading into DTHQ (the band's newly constructed studio) to get started on a new album.

Four of the five members wrote together in-studio, while frontman James LaBrie instead contributed via video conference meetings remotely from Canada, as not to risk any potential compromising of his voice. When asked in an interview about the album's progress, Petrucci said that the writing sessions were "off to a great start". These sessions spanned over the next four months until March, after which LaBrie, at last, flew from Canada to meet them in New York to record vocals. This recording session also marked Dream Theater's first collaboration with Andy Sneap, who mixed and mastered the album, having recently worked with Petrucci on his second solo album Terminal Velocity (2020).

Dream Theater teased the album on July 26, 2021, revealing the initials of each of the seven song's titles and their respective runtimes. Two days later, it was announced that the album was titled A View from the Top of the World, and was planned for release on October 22, 2021. "The Alien" and "Invisible Monster" were both released as singles, while music videos for "Awaken the Master", "Transcending Time" and "Answering the Call" were each released after the album's release.

"The Alien" won the Grammy for Best Metal Performance in 2022, giving the band their first Grammy win after having been nominated for the third time (they were nominated in 2012 for "On the Backs of Angels" and in 2014 with "The Enemy Inside").

The front cover photo is of Kjeragbolten in Norway.

== Accolades ==
Publication	Accolade	Rank
Consequence	Top 30 Metal & Hard Rock Albums	22
Guitar World	The 20 Best Guitar Albums of 2021	5
Loudwire	The 45 Best Rock + Metal Albums of 2021	35
Metal Hammer	Top 10 Prog Metal Albums of 2021	6
Prog	Top 20 Albums of 2021	11

== Track listing ==
All music is composed by John Petrucci, John Myung, Jordan Rudess, James LaBrie and Mike Mangini.

No.	Title	Lyrics	Length
1.	"The Alien"	James LaBrie	9:32
2.	"Answering the Call"	LaBrie	7:35
3.	"Invisible Monster"	John Petrucci	6:31
4.	"Sleeping Giant"	Petrucci	10:05
5.	"Transcending Time"	Petrucci	6:25
6.	"Awaken the Master"	John Myung	9:47
7.	"A View from the Top of the World": "I. The Crowning Glory"; "II. Rapture of the Deep"; "III. The Driving Force"	Petrucci	20:24
Total length:			70:19

== Personnel ==
Dream Theater

- James LaBrie – vocals
- John Petrucci – guitar
- Jordan Rudess – keyboards
- John Myung – bass
- Mike Mangini – drums

Production

- John Petrucci – production
- James "Jimmy T" Meslin – engineering, additional production
- Andy Sneap – mixing, mastering
- Hugh Syme – art direction, illustration, design
- Rayon Richards – band photos

== Charts ==
Chart performance for A View from the Top of the World
Chart (2021)	Peak position
Australian Albums (ARIA)	42
Austrian Albums (Ö3 Austria)	5
Belgian Albums (Ultratop Flanders)	12
Belgian Albums (Ultratop Wallonia)	16
Canadian Albums (Billboard)	32
Czech Albums (ČNS IFPI)	27
Dutch Albums (Album Top 100)	3
Finnish Albums (Suomen virallinen lista)	1
French Albums (SNEP)	30
German Albums (Offizielle Top 100)	2
Hungarian Albums (MAHASZ)	11
Italian Albums (FIMI)	9
Japan Hot Albums (Billboard Japan)	9
Japanese Albums (Oricon)	8
Norwegian Albums (VG-lista)	13
Polish Albums (ZPAV)	6
Portuguese Albums (AFP)	8
Scottish Albums (Official Charts)	10
Slovak Albums (ČNS IFPI)	62
Spanish Albums (Promusicae)	21
Swedish Albums (Sverigetopplistan)	21
Swiss Albums (Schweizer Hitparade)	3
UK Albums (Official Charts)	21
UK Rock & Metal Albums (Official Charts)	2
US Billboard 200	52
US Independent Albums (Billboard)	8
US Top Hard Rock Albums (Billboard)	3
US Top Rock Albums (Billboard)	10
