= Astonishing =

Astonishing may refer to:

- Astonishing, Atlas Comics/Marvel Comics publication from 1951 to 1957
- Astonishing Tales, Marvel Comics publication from 1970 to 1976 and 2009
- The Astonishing, a 2016 album by Dream Theater
- Astonishing Stories, an American science fiction magazine published from 1940 to 1943
- "Astonishing", song from Little Women
