= Parasomnia (album) =

2025 studio album by Dream Theater

Studio album by Dream Theater
- Released: February 7, 2025
- Recorded: February–July 2024
- Studios: DTHQ, Long Island, New York
- Genre: Progressive metal
- Length: 71:15
- Label: Inside Out
- Producer: John Petrucci

Dream Theater chronology
A View from the Top of the World (2021)	Parasomnia (2025)	Quarantième: Live à Paris (2025)

Singles from Parasomnia
- 1. "Night Terror" Released: October 10, 2024; 2. "A Broken Man" Released: December 3, 2024; 3. "Midnight Messiah" Released: January 22, 2025

Parasomnia is the sixteenth studio album by American progressive metal band Dream Theater, released on February 7, 2025. It is the band's first studio album to feature original drummer Mike Portnoy since Black Clouds & Silver Linings (2009), nearly sixteen years earlier; it is also the first album with Portnoy to not feature him as co-producer since Falling into Infinity (1997).

== Background and production ==
Dream Theater's intention to work on their sixteenth studio album was first mentioned about six months after the release of A View from the Top of the World, with keyboardist Jordan Rudess speaking to VW Music about the band's future plans: "After we get back from its last show of the European tour we have a bit of a break. And after I finish my solo shows, Dream Theater will continue on the road with some shows in Japan, South America, and more to be announced as we go. When that settles down, we'll be entering the studio again, and doing a new album, which will be awesome. So, yeah, stuff like that is on the horizon."

In October 2022, guitarist John Petrucci stated that Dream Theater would begin recording their sixteenth studio album in late 2023. Two months later, frontman James LaBrie said that he did not "see [the band] going into the studio until the beginning of '24", adding, "I don't think it would make sense to be in there before then. But don't quote me on that. Some things always change."

On October 25, 2023, Dream Theater announced that drummer Mike Mangini had departed as they reunited with Mike Portnoy after thirteen years, a culmination of reconciliation between Portnoy, Petrucci, Myung, Rudess and LaBrie; LaBrie and Portnoy had not spoken for eleven years until their 2022 show in New York. The band confirmed that it would record its first studio album with Portnoy in fifteen years. Said Portnoy in an interview with Rolling Stone, "I don't want to be over-philosophical about it, but we're all getting older. Here we are in our 50s and 60s. You start to think of the reality of, 'How much time do we have left?' I would hate it if this were to become a Roger Waters–Pink Floyd or Peter Gabriel with Genesis situation where the fans want it, but it never happens."

Progress on the follow-up to A View from the Top of the World had begun by February 2024, when Portnoy posted pictures from DTHQ on his Instagram account, revealing that the album was being recorded. On April 2, 2024, Petrucci and Portnoy announced that all of the writing and the drum tracks were completed, and further recording took place until July of that year.

In an interview with The Prog Report, LaBrie discussed how he had been seeing voice pathologist Dr. Aaron Low at The Voice Clinic in Toronto, Ontario in 2024 while recording Parasomnia, which LaBrie called an epiphany and has left him singing like he did 30 years ago.

On October 10, 2024, Dream Theater released "Night Terror" as the first single for the album and announced the title, track list and release date. A second single, "A Broken Man", was released on December 3, 2024, followed by "Midnight Messiah" on January 22, 2025.

== Lyrics ==
Parasomnia is a thematic concept album about parasomnias, encompassing a wide range of unusual and undesirable experiences and behaviors people experience in their sleep, also known as disruptive sleep disorders: "Night Terror" describes the experience of the titular night terrors, "A Broken Man" deals with the psychological stress affecting sleep with PTSD, "Dead Asleep" is drawn from a real life incident where a Welshman named Brian Thomas in 2009 allegedly murdered his wife while sleepwalking, and "The Shadow Man Incident" is a story about a child experiencing sleep paralysis and witnessing a shadow person. "Midnight Messiah", written by Mike Portnoy, lyrically references other Dream Theater songs he wrote, including "Strange Deja Vu" and "Home" from Metropolis Pt. 2: Scenes from a Memory, “This Dying Soul” from Train of Thought and "Constant Motion" from Systematic Chaos. The album is bookended by the sounds of a person going to sleep and eventually waking back up.

== Graphic album ==
Nearly 6 months after Parasomnia's release, the band released Parasomnia - The Graphic Album in partnership with Z2 Comics. Serving as a companion book to the album, Parasomnia - The Graphic Album features various award-winning artists that expand the explorations of Parasomnia with unique visual interpretations for all eight songs. Several various editions were released including a platinum edition signed by the band.

== Reception ==
Professional ratings
Review scores
Source	Rating
AllMusic	3.5/5 stars
Blabbermouth.net	9/10
Classic Rock	3/5 stars
Maximum Volume Music	9.5/10
MetalSucks	4.5/5
Sputnikmusic	4.0/5

Parasomnia has received mostly positive reviews. Dom Lawson of Blabbermouth.net gave the album a rating of nine out of ten, and wrote, "Dream Theater are back—despite, in truth, never going anywhere—and the magic that informed their early, timeless classics is plastered all over this absolute triumph of a recorded return."

MetalSucks rated the album 4 1/2 stars out of 5, stating: "Dream Theater never went away, but at the same time it feels like they're back, somehow. Parasomnia is full of renewed vigor, reflecting the palpable excitement of their dedicated fanbase. It's tasteful, technical when it needs to be but not overly so, making it accessible for just about anyone but still with plenty there for theory nerds to sit down and dissect. It's not just great progressive metal, it's great music, period, and anyone who appreciates music in any capacity will surely find something to enjoy about this album. If your average Joe tried to sit down and play it their fingers would probably fly off and explode, but it's not exhausting to listen to, either. Quite the opposite, in fact. It's a ton of fun, and hopefully a portent of many more great things to come."

Rating the album 3 out of 5, Classic Rock magazine's Hugh Felder said, "Although [Mike Portnoy's] stand-in Mike Mangini never really departed from the template that had already been laid down, there's a rejuvenated feel to this reunion album of the 'dream team', which is themed around the impact of sleep disruption from sleepwalking to nightmares."

Sputnikmusic gave a positive review stating that "Despite essentially sticking to the same formula they've been employing since bringing on Jordan Rudess, Parasomnia still feels like a breath of fresh air. Maybe it's because this is their darkest, most guitar-driven album since Train of Thought. Maybe it's the smattering of modern ideas or the way the songs manage to strike a perfect balance—structured enough to feel cohesive yet intricate enough to deliver the prog elements Dream Theater fans love. Maybe it's a little of everything. Of course, Mike Portnoy's return plays a major role, bringing his signature flair to both the drumming and songwriting. After nearly 15 years of middling releases, Parasomnia is a triumphant return to form—possibly their most creative, focused, and engaging work since Metropolis, Pt. 2."

Andy Thorley of Maximum Volume Music wrote in his review: "Parasomnia—[Dream Theater's] 16th record—is a journey into the dark, and there's little light at the end of the tunnel, fitting given that its title is a term for disruptive sleep-related disturbances including sleepwalking, sleep paralysis, and night terrors—given the length of the songs, the album feels like a real descent into pain, before a funky section reminds us of their unbreakable spirit—And really, there was only one way this was going to end: a massive, winding 20-minute epic. Parasomnia delivers—yet again—utterly incredibly. You can pay it no higher a compliment than to say it's up there with A Change of Seasons."

It was elected by Loudwire as one of the 11 best progressive metal albums of 2025 and by Goldmine as one of the 11 top prog albums of the same year.

Upon release, Ben Jones of the band Orion noted on social media that artwork licensed from Hugh Syme for Orion's album The Lightbringers, released six months earlier, was identical to artwork in the booklet of the deluxe edition of Parasomnia.

=== Pre-release ===
Parasomnia was highly anticipated, with Loudwire, Stereogum and Ultimate Guitar naming it in their lists of the most anticipated albums of 2025.

== Track listing ==
All music is composed by John Petrucci, John Myung, Jordan Rudess, James LaBrie and Mike Portnoy.

Parasomnia track listing
No.	Title	Lyrics	Length
1.	"In the Arms of Morpheus"	(instrumental)	5:22
2.	"Night Terror"	Petrucci	9:55
3.	"A Broken Man"	LaBrie	8:30
4.	"Dead Asleep"	Petrucci	11:06
5.	"Midnight Messiah"	Portnoy	7:58
6.	"Are We Dreaming?"	(interlude)	1:28
7.	"Bend the Clock"	LaBrie	7:24
8.	"The Shadow Man Incident"	Petrucci	19:32
Total length:			71:15

== Personnel ==
Dream Theater

- James LaBrie – lead vocals
- John Petrucci – guitars, backing vocals, production
- John Myung – bass
- Jordan Rudess – keyboards
- Mike Portnoy – drums, percussion, backing vocals

Production

- James "Jimmy T" Meslin – engineering, additional production, mixing on "Are We Dreaming?"
- Andy Sneap – engineering, mixing, mastering
- Mark Gittins – Dolby Atmos mixing
- Hugh Syme – art direction, illustration, design
- Mark Maryanovich – photography

== Charts ==
=== Weekly charts ===
Weekly chart performance for Parasomnia
Chart (2025)	Peak position
Australian Albums (ARIA)	24
Austrian Albums (Ö3 Austria)	4
Belgian Albums (Ultratop Flanders)	5
Belgian Albums (Ultratop Wallonia)	6
Canadian Albums (Billboard)	66
Croatian International Albums (HDU)	7
Dutch Albums (Album Top 100)	4
Finnish Albums (Suomen virallinen lista)	6
French Albums (SNEP)	15
French Rock & Metal Albums (SNEP)	1
German Albums (Offizielle Top 100)	3
Hungarian Albums (MAHASZ)	10
Italian Albums (FIMI)	8
Japanese Albums (Oricon)	12
Japanese Digital Albums (Oricon)	4
Norwegian Albums (VG-lista)	9
Polish Albums (ZPAV)	4
Scottish Albums (Official Charts)	5
Spanish Albums (Promusicae)	10
Swedish Albums (Sverigetopplistan)	9
Swiss Albums (Schweizer Hitparade)	2
UK Albums (Official Charts)	23
UK Rock & Metal Albums (Official Charts)	1
US Billboard 200	41
US Top Rock & Alternative Albums (Billboard)	6

=== Year-end charts ===
Year-end chart performance for Parasomnia
Chart (2025)	Position
Swiss Albums (Schweizer Hitparade)	96
