= Octavarium (song) =

Song by Dream Theater

from the album Octavarium
- Released: June 6, 2005
- Recorded: 2005
- Studio: The Hit Factory, New York City
- Genre: Progressive rock
- Length: 24:00
- Label: Atlantic
- Composer: Dream Theater
- Lyricists: James LaBrie; John Petrucci; Mike Portnoy
- Producers: John Petrucci; Mike Portnoy

"Octavarium" is a song by American progressive metal band Dream Theater, from the album of the same name.

== Composition ==
The song starts with Jordan Rudess using his Haken Continuum Fingerboard (an addition to the keyboard that allows for smooth sliding between notes) and his lap steel guitar, drawing references from Pink Floyd's "Shine On You Crazy Diamond", Tangerine Dream, Marty Friedman's Scenes, and Queen's "Bijou". Octavarium also pays homage to progressive rock bands such as Pink Floyd by having a runtime of 24 minutes and exploring many complex rhythmic and melodic ideas. Dream Theater also uses a sixteen-piece orchestra in this song, and throughout the rest of the album of the same name. This gives the album an orchestral feel that is fairly common within the progressive rock genre.

== Movements ==
Octavarium has five parts, and starts out an octave higher than The Root Of All Evil.

=== I. Someone Like Him ===
- 0:00 - 8:47 (8:47)
- Lyrics by John Petrucci

Beginning with a lengthy Continuum / lap steel guitar solo by Jordan Rudess, this section is told from a first-person perspective. It portrays the thoughts of a person as he decides on what to do in the course of his lifetime, as well as his wish to never become an ordinary person. This seems to draw from the "Carpe Diem" theme that influenced "A Change of Seasons" heavily.

He succeeds in living an extraordinary life, but reflects upon it, and ends up wishing he had become an ordinary person, 'Someone like Him'. This is also in line with the 'Razor’s Edge' theme of Octavarium: "this story ends where it began".

Another theory about this section is that it talks about John Petrucci's music career, first admiring his idols but not wanting to become a complete rip off, and eventually changing his mind and realizing what he wanted all along, to write progressive rock.

In the live performances of the complete version of "Octavarium," John Petrucci uses his custom-made "Blue Sparkle" twelve-string/six-string double-neck guitar for this section of the song. Other songs he uses this particular guitar on are the live performances of "Solitary Shell" from Six Degrees Of Inner Turbulence, "Regression" from Metropolis Pt. 2: Scenes from a Memory and some songs from The Astonishing.

=== II. Medicate (Awakening) ===
- 8:48 - 13:49 (5:01)
- Lyrics by James LaBrie

A person wakes up to discover a doctor sitting at his bedside. The doctor informs him that he has been in catatonic sleep for 30 years, but he believes he has finally cured him. However, the patient is in dire need of help as he feels his consciousness fading. The doctor prescribes a higher dosage of medicine, but it doesn't seem to help. Despite the doctor's failure in assisting him, the patient tells the doctor that he's not at fault, and that he shouldn't feel ashamed. Eventually, the patient slips back into a state of catatonia. This is in line with the events of the movie Awakenings.

Again, this also reflects the theme of 'Everything ends where it began.'

=== III. Full Circle ===
- 13:49 - 18:27 (4:38)
- Lyrics by Mike Portnoy

Full Circle is Mike Portnoy's ode to his musical influences, shown in the lyrics by several underlying references to his favorite songs, bands and more. This kind of composition is called Cento. Once again a reference is made to the unifying theme of the song ('Everything ends where it begins'). The enumeration using the last syllable/word as the beginning of the next reference enhances the message that everything is linked, a common theme throughout Dream Theater's albums. (e.g. "Day for Night, mare Cinema, Show"). There is also another subtle nod to the theme in the references themselves; the section begins and ends with a Pink Floyd reference.

- Isn't This Where We Came In? – Pink Floyd's The Wall
- "Sailing the Seas of Cheese" – Primus
- "Seven Seas of Rhye" – Queen
- "Seize the Day" – Theme of the album, A Change of Seasons and a calque of the Latin phrase, Carpe Diem, which is also the third movement of the album's title track
- "Day Tripper" – The Beatles
- Per diem – Latin phrase and business term meaning "each day"
- Jack the Ripper - English serial killer
- Ripper Owens - Former singer of Judas Priest who took his nickname from the song "The Ripper"
- Owen Wilson – actor
- Wilson Phillips – band
- "Supper's Ready" – Genesis
- "Lucy in the Sky with Diamonds" – The Beatles
- "Diamond Dave" – David Lee Roth's nickname and a song from his 2003 album of the same name
- Dave's Not Here – Famous line from Cheech and Chong's self-titled album
- "Here I Come to Save the Day" – Mighty Mouse theme song and refrain
- Day for Night – Spock's Beard
- Nightmare Cinema – Dream Theater's band name when their players swap instruments
- "The Cinema Show" – Genesis
- "Show Me The Way" – Peter Frampton
- "Get Back" – The Beatles
- Home Again – Pink Floyd's "Breathe (Reprise)"
- "Flying off the Handle" – Peter Blegvad, King Strut
- "Handle with Care" – Traveling Wilburys
- "Careful with That Axe, Eugene" – Pink Floyd
- "Gene Gene the Dance Machine" – The Gong Show
- "Machine Messiah" – Yes
- "Light My Fire" – The Doors
- "Pinhead (Gabba Gabba Hey)" – The Ramones
- "Hey Hey, My My" – Neil Young
- "My Generation" – The Who
- Home Again – Pink Floyd's "Breathe (Reprise)"

=== IV. Intervals ===
- 18:29 - 19:51 (1:22)
- Lyrics by Mike Portnoy

Before each stanza in the lyrics, Mike Portnoy says a scale degree. In each stanza, a song from Octavarium is referenced, and an audio clip from that song is played in the background. As this part progresses, the guitar and drum rhythm starts to intensify after each stanza.

- Mike Portnoy says "Root"
  - "Take all of me" (from 3:03 in "The Root of All Evil") plays in the background
- Mike Portnoy says "Second"
  - "Don't let the day go by" (from 4:21 in "The Answer Lies Within") plays in the background
- Mike Portnoy says "Third"
  - A clip from "These Walls" plays in the background
- Mike Portnoy says "Fourth"
  - "I walk beside you" (from 1:06 in "I Walk Beside You") plays in the background
- Mike Portnoy says "Fifth"
  - "Hysteria" (from 3:55 in "Panic Attack") plays in the background
- Mike Portnoy says "Sixth"
  - "What would you say" (from 3:03 in "Never Enough") plays in the background
- Mike Portnoy says "Seventh"
  - A clip from "Sacrificed Sons" plays in the background
- Mike Portnoy says "Octave"
  - "Side effects appear" (from 11:52 in Octavarium part II) plays in the background

Root	Our deadly sins fill his mortal wrath Remove all obstacles from our path	Fifth	Tortured insanity, a smothering hell Try to escape but to no avail
The Root of All Evil	Our deadly sins fill his mortal wrath Remove all obstacles from our path	Panic Attack	Tortured insanity, a smothering hell Try to escape but to no avail
Second	Asking questions, search for clues The answer's been right in front of you	Sixth	The calls of admirers who claim they adore Drain all your lifeblood while begging for more
The Answer Lies Within	Asking questions, search for clues The answer's been right in front of you	Never Enough	The calls of admirers who claim they adore Drain all your lifeblood while begging for more
Third	Try to break through, long to connect Fall on deaf ears with failed muted breath	Seventh	Innocent victims of merciless crimes Fall prey to some madmen's impulsive designs
These Walls	Try to break through, long to connect Fall on deaf ears with failed muted breath	Sacrificed Sons	Innocent victims of merciless crimes Fall prey to some madmen's impulsive designs
Fourth	Loyalty, trust, faith and desire Carries love through each darkest fire	Octave	Step after step, we try controlling our fate When we finally start living it's become too late
I Walk Beside You	Loyalty, trust, faith and desire Carries love through each darkest fire	Octavarium	Step after step, we try controlling our fate When we finally start living it's become too late

To finish the Octave, LaBrie repeats the line "Trapped inside this Octavarium", meaning that the speaker is trapped in the Octavarium's full circle, which begins and ends the same. To enunciate the intensity of this statement, LaBrie screams the line, straining his voice more than he had done for over a decade. By the time the song reaches the fourth repeat of the line, his voice has reached as high as G5, the highest note heard on a Dream Theater studio song from vocals, beating the famous F# in "Learning to Live" (this was later superseded by the chorus of "Build Me Up, Break Me Down" from A Dramatic Turn of Events). During live performances, LaBrie usually sings the first three lines with the same notes, then jumps to the note on the last two syllables of the word "Octavarium", sometimes going as high as A5, holding the note and doing trills downwards on the last.

=== V. Razor's Edge ===
- 19:52 - 24:00 (4:10)
- Lyrics by John Petrucci

This movement simply emphasizes the cyclical nature of all things, as well as the album, as it begins where it ends, using the same melody as the end to the first track, it also ends with the same note that "The Root of All Evil" begins with.

This movement also serves as the capstone for the song and the album which shares its name, being the fifth movement in the eighth song on the album. In this way, it continues the 5:8 theme. When performed live as part of "Schmedley Wilcox" on Chaos in Motion, Mike Portnoy adds in additional vocal emphasis to portions of this movement.

Also the name of the section is a reference to the Iron Maiden song "The Evil That Men Do". Another way in which this part ties into the cyclical nature of the album is that it is part five of Octavarium. The first song on the album, The Root of All Evil, begins with part six (as it is continuing the Twelve-Step Suite).

This movements lyrics also references Rush's Progressive epic Hemispheres, by mirroring the "Perfect Sphere Theme".

Hemispheres - "...With the heart and mind united in a single perfect sphere."

Octavarium - "A Perfect Sphere, colliding with our fate..."

Also, the first movement and the last movement were written by the same person, again referring to the theme "Everything ends where it began"

== Personnel ==
- James LaBrie – lead vocals
- John Petrucci – guitar
- John Myung – bass guitar
- Jordan Rudess – keyboards, continuum, lap steel
- Mike Portnoy – drums, backing vocals
