= Reaching Out =

Reaching Out may refer to:

== Music ==
=== Albums ===
- Reaching Out (Dave Bailey album) or the title song, 1961
- Reaching Out (Menudo album), 1984
- Reaching Out, by Kabir Suman, 2003

=== Songs ===
- "Reaching Out" (Nero song), 2011
- "Reaching Out" (Queen + Paul Rodgers song), 2005; originally by Rock Therapy, 1996
- "Reaching Out", by the Bee Gees from Spirits Having Flown, 1979
- "Reaching Out", by Kate Bush from The Sensual World, 1989
- "Reaching Out", by Snot from Strait Up, 2000

== Television ==
- Reaching Out (TV series), a 2001 Hong Kong drama series
- "Reaching Out" (The Colbys), a 1986 episode
- "Reaching Out" (The Owl House), a 2022 episode

== Other uses ==
- Reaching Out (sculpture), a 2020 work by Thomas J. Price on Greenwich Meridian Line, London
- Reaching Out MBA, an American nonprofit organization aiding LGBT+ MBA students and graduates
- Reaching Out Romania, a non-governmental organization helping girls to leave the sex industry

== See also ==
- Reach Out (disambiguation)
