= Just Out of Reach (disambiguation) =

Just Out of Reach may refer to:

- Just Out of Reach, a 1975 album by Perry Como
- "Just Out of Reach" (song), a 1965 song by the Zombies
- "Just Out of Reach (of My Two Open Arms)", a popular song
- Just Out of Reach (film), a 1979 film
- "Just Out of Reach", a song by The Jesus and Mary Chain, from Barbed Wire Kisses
- "Just Out of Reach", a 2014 song by Mayday Parade from Black Lines

== See also ==
- Out of Reach (disambiguation)
