= Distant Memories – Live in London =

2020 live album by Dream Theater

Live album by Dream Theater
- Released: November 27, 2020
- Recorded: February 21–22, 2020
- Venue: Hammersmith Apollo, London
- Genre: Progressive metal
- Length: 149:39 (CD); 155:49 (DVD and Bluray)
- Label: Inside Out Music
- Producer: John Petrucci

Dream Theater chronology
| Distance Over Time (2019) | Distant Memories – Live in London (2020) | A View from the Top of the World (2021) |

Singles from Distant Memories – Live in London
- 1. "Pale Blue Dot" Released: September 25, 2020; 2. "Fatal Tragedy" Released: November 6, 2020; 3. "The Spirit Carries On" Released: December 13, 2020; 4. "At Wit's End" Released: April 21, 2022

Distant Memories – Live in London is the ninth live album and video by American progressive metal band Dream Theater. Recorded on February 21 and 22, 2020, at the Hammersmith Apollo during Dream Theater's 2019-2020 Distance Over Time Tour, in support of the album Distance Over Time. The first half of the album consists mostly of songs from Distance Over Time, while the second half features a complete performance of the album Metropolis Pt. 2: Scenes from a Memory, in commemoration of its 20th anniversary. This is the second Dream Theater live album to feature a complete performance of Scenes from a Memory, after 2001's Live Scenes from New York. Outside of entries in the Lost Not Forgotten Archives series, this is Dream Theater's last live album to feature drummer Mike Mangini.

The album was released in a number of formats, including CD, DVD, Blu-ray, and Vinyl and combinations thereof.

== Track listing ==
Disc 1

1. "Untethered Angel" (Petrucci) – 5:55
2. "A Nightmare to Remember" (Petrucci) – 16:37
3. "Fall Into the Light" (Myung) – 7:26
4. "Barstool Warrior" (Petrucci) – 6:42
5. "In the Presence of Enemies – Part 1" (Petrucci) – 8:43
6. "Pale Blue Dot" (Petrucci) – 8:52

Disc 2

1. "Scenes Live Intro" – 1:44
2. "Scene One: Regression" (Petrucci) – 2:06
3. "Scene Two: I. Overture 1928" (instrumental) – 3:38
4. "Scene Two: II. Strange Déjà Vu" (Portnoy) – 5:03
5. "Scene Three: I. Through My Words" (Petrucci) – 1:02
6. "Scene Three: II. Fatal Tragedy" (Myung) – 6:53
7. "Scene Four: Beyond This Life" (Petrucci) – 11:26
8. "Scene Five: Through Her Eyes" (Petrucci) – 6:45

Disc 3

1. "Scene Six: Home" (Portnoy) – 13:01
2. "Scene Seven: I. The Dance of Eternity" (instrumental) – 6:09
3. "Scene Seven: II. One Last Time" (LaBrie) – 3:48
4. "Scene Eight: The Spirit Carries On" (Petrucci) – 6:39
5. "Scene Nine: Finally Free" (Portnoy) – 12:54
6. "At Wit's End" (LaBrie) – 9:42
7. "Paralyzed" (Petrucci) – 4:34 (bonus track)

Note: Video releases add the tour intro video and all the on stage speech, making the actual concert length as specified

== Personnel ==
- James LaBrie – lead vocals
- John Petrucci – guitars, backing vocals, production
- John Myung – bass
- Jordan Rudess – keyboards
- Mike Mangini – drums, percussion

== Charts ==
| Chart (2020) | Peak position |
|---|---|
| Austrian Albums (Ö3 Austria) | 37 |
| Belgian Albums (Ultratop Flanders) | 48 |
| Belgian Albums (Ultratop Wallonia) | 71 |
| Dutch Albums (Album Top 100) | 31 |
| Finnish Albums (Suomen virallinen lista) | 13 |
| French Albums (SNEP) | 122 |
| German Albums (Offizielle Top 100) | 9 |
| Italian Albums (FIMI) | 39 |
| Portuguese Albums (AFP) | 12 |
| Spanish Albums (PROMUSICAE) | 27 |
| Swiss Albums (Schweizer Hitparade) | 9 |
