= Wither (song) =

Single by Dream Theater

from the album Black Clouds & Silver Linings
- B-side: "The Best of Times"
- Released: September 15, 2009
- Recorded: 2008–2009
- Genre: Pop metal, power ballad
- Length: 5:25
- Label: Roadrunner
- Songwriter: John Petrucci
- Producers: John Petrucci; Mike Portnoy

Dream Theater singles chronology
"The Silent Man" (1995)	"Wither" (2009)	"On the Backs of Angels" (2011)

Wither is a single by American progressive metal band Dream Theater, released on September 15, 2009. The single contains the album version of the song "Wither", an alternative version of "Wither" with vocals and piano only, a demo of "Wither" with John Petrucci on vocals, and a demo of "The Best of Times" with Mike Portnoy on vocals. It was the band's last official release with Portnoy, who left the band in September 2010 until his return in October 2023. This is the only studio release without the Majesty symbol in its front cover.

It was released exclusively as a digital download.

== Music video ==
The video shows the band on tour in support of the album Black Clouds & Silver Linings. Scenes are shown of the band playing live and as well as offstage events including meeting and greeting fans during their Progressive Nation Tour. Mikael Åkerfeldt of Opeth can be seen in the video alongside Mike Portnoy during the band interviews.

The concert venues in the video:

- Zénith de Lille - Lille, France (October 6, 2009)
- Rotterdam Ahoy – Rotterdam, Netherlands (October 7, 2009)
- O2 Apollo – Manchester, England (October 9, 2009)
- Wembley Arena – London, England (October 10, 2009)

== Song ==
"Wither" is a ballad written by the band's guitarist John Petrucci about the process that he goes through during the writing of the song. It is the third song on the band's tenth album, Black Clouds & Silver Linings and the shortest song on the album. The music starts quietly with an acoustic guitar before moving to a powerful tone.

== Track listing ==
All tracks are written by John Petrucci, except where noted.

No.	Title	Lyrics	Music	Length
1.	"Wither"			5:25
2.	"Wither" (piano version)			5:08
3.	"Wither" (John Petrucci vocal demo)			5:26
4.	"The Best of Times" (Mike Portnoy vocal demo)	Mike Portnoy	Petrucci; Portnoy; Jordan Rudess; John Myung	13:05

== Credits ==
- James LaBrie – lead vocals
- John Myung – bass guitar
- John Petrucci – guitars, lead vocals on track 3
- Mike Portnoy – drums, lead vocals on track 4
- Jordan Rudess – keyboards
