= Reach Out =

Reach Out may refer to:

In music:

- Reach Out (Four Tops album), 1967
  - "Reach Out I'll Be There", also known as "Reach Out (I'll Be There)", a song by Four Tops
- Reach Out (Burt Bacharach album), 1967
- Reach Out! (Hank Mobley album), 1968
- Reach Out! (Hal Galper album), 1977
- Reach Out (S.E.S. album)
- Reach Out: The Motown Record, an album by Human Nature
- "Reach Out" (Cheap Trick song)
- "Reach Out" (Giorgio Moroder song), the track-and-field theme song for the 1984 Summer Olympics by Giorgio Moroder and Paul Engemann
- "Reach Out" (Hilary Duff song)
- "Reach Out" (Joan Armatrading song)
- "Reach Out" (Take That song)
- "Reach Out" (Victoria Monét song)
- "Reach Out", a song by Bethany Dillon from Stop & Listen
- "Reach Out", a song by George Duke from Guardian of the Light, 1983
- "Reach Out", a song by Iron Maiden, B-side of the single "Wasted Years"
- "Reach Out", a song by James Morrison from Higher Than Here
- "Reach Out", a song by Sufjan Stevens and Angelo De Augustine from the album A Beginner's Mind
- "Reach Out", a song by Sweet Mercy
- "Reach Out", a song by Westlife from Where We Are

In organizations:

- ReachOut.com, an internet mental-health support service for teens and young adults
- ReachOut Healthcare America
- ReachOut an app by Kyle Kashuv

== See also ==
- Outreach, an effort by an organization to connect to others
- Reaching Out (disambiguation)
