= Charlie Dominici =

American singer (1951–2023)

Background information
- Born: June 16, 1951
- Origin: Brooklyn, New York, U.S.
- Died: November 17, 2023 (aged 72)
- Genres: Progressive metal; hard rock
- Occupation: Singer
- Years active: 1960s–1990; 2005–2015
- Labels: InsideOut Music; Dominici Records; Century Music
- Formerly of: Dominici; Dream Theater; Franke and the Knockouts; Billy and Charles

Charlie Dominici (/dɒmɪˈniːtʃi/ do-mi-NEE-chee; June 16, 1951 – November 17, 2023) was an American singer, best known as the second vocalist for the progressive metal band Dream Theater, having replaced Chris Collins (while the band was called Majesty) and later being replaced by James LaBrie. Dominici fronted his own self-named progressive metal band, that released three albums.

== Biography ==
Charlie Dominici was born in Brooklyn, New York, and soon after moved with his family to the Five Towns region in Nassau County, Long Island. His album debut was with folk duo Billy and Charles (consisting of Dominici and Carly Simon collaborator Billy Mernit) in 1970. Professionally, he came into prominence as a member of Franke and the Knockouts, in which he played guitar and sang backing vocals. He auditioned for Dream Theater in 1987 and was hired for the job in November of that year.

Dominici performed on the band's debut album, 1989's When Dream and Day Unite. However, Dominici was older than the rest of the band and there were personal and creative differences at work. It was felt that, despite being a very talented singer, his decidedly "pop" vocal style did not fit in with the distinctive progressive direction that the band's compositions were taking. According to Dream Theater drummer Mike Portnoy, "It was like having Billy Joel singing in Queensrÿche." A good singer in the wrong band, they amicably parted ways shortly thereafter.

Dominici remained in contact with Dream Theater throughout their career, despite lapsing out of the music business and obtaining a job as a finance manager in the automobile business. Dominici was hired by Mike Portnoy to sing at his wedding to Marlene Apuzzo. He started working on an album with his brother, guitarist Kane Daily, that never saw the light of day. In 2003, he released a song on his website titled "Now the Time Has Come" but it was taken down after a few months, and the track did not feature any guitars, only piano.

Dominici's voice was also heard on the YtseJam Records release "When Dream and Day Unite Demos" which featured pre-production and vocal demos of several songs, as well as Dominici singing Beatles covers and the traditional Christmas song "O Holy Night".

On March 6, 2004, Dominici joined his former bandmates onstage in Los Angeles for the first time in 15 years for a special performance celebrating the 15th anniversary of the band's first album, singing on "To Live Forever" (a non-album track written in the same time period) and "Metropolis" along with LaBrie and former keyboardist Derek Sherinian. This performance was later released as "When Dream and Day Reunite", the DVD version which also features footage from the band's 1989 tour with Dominici.

Despite having not actively sung since leaving Dream Theater in 1989, this performance gave him the itch to make music again and in 2005, he released a solo album entitled O_{3}: A Trilogy, Part 1, the first album of a three-album concept piece. The second installment of the trilogy was released in February 2007 and the final part was released in April 2008.

Dominici opened for Dream Theater at three shows at their Chaos in Motion Tour in June 2007.

On November 17, 2023, Dominici's former Dream Theater bandmates announced that he died at the age of 72.

== Discography ==
=== With Billy and Charles ===
- Billy and Charles (1970)

=== With Franke and the Knockouts ===
- Franke and the Knockouts (1981)

=== With Dream Theater ===
- When Dream and Day Unite (1989)
- When Dream and Day Unite Demos (2004)
- When Dream and Day Reunite (CD and DVD) (2005)

=== With Dominici ===
- O_{3} A Trilogy - Part 1 (2005)
- O_{3} A Trilogy - Part 2 (2007)
- O_{3} A Trilogy - Part 3 (2008)
