= Black Clouds & Silver Linings =

2009 studio album by Dream Theater

Studio album by Dream Theater
- Released: June 23, 2009
- Recorded: October 2008 – March 2009
- Studio: Avatar, New York City
- Genre: Progressive metal; progressive rock
- Length: 75:25
- Label: Roadrunner
- Producer: John Petrucci; Mike Portnoy

Dream Theater chronology
Chaos in Motion 2007–2008 (2008)	Black Clouds & Silver Linings (2009)	A Dramatic Turn of Events (2011)

Singles from Black Clouds & Silver Linings
- 1. "A Rite of Passage" Released: May 11, 2009; 2. "Wither" Released: September 15, 2009

Black Clouds & Silver Linings is the tenth studio album by American progressive metal band Dream Theater, released on June 23, 2009, through Roadrunner Records. It was the last album to feature drummer and founding member Mike Portnoy until Parasomnia (2025) following his return in 2023.

The album was recorded between October 2008 and March 2009 at Avatar Studios in New York City, where they previously recorded Falling into Infinity (1997) and Systematic Chaos (2007). Black Clouds & Silver Linings was produced by John Petrucci and Portnoy (their final album to be produced jointly as of 2024, since Parasomnia was solely produced by Petrucci), and was engineered and mixed by Paul Northfield.

Black Clouds & Silver Linings was a major success for Dream Theater, becoming their highest-charting album on the Billboard 200, where it peaked at number six.

== History ==
Dream Theater began to work on the album in October 2008. Mike Portnoy described Black Clouds & Silver Linings as, "a Dream Theater album with 'A Change of Seasons', 'Octavarium', 'Learning to Live', 'Pull Me Under' and 'The Glass Prison' all on one album." Jordan Rudess said at a NAMM Show that Spectrasonics virtual instruments were used on the album.

=== Lyrical themes ===
The album's lyrics were written by John Petrucci and Mike Portnoy, and all except one concern personal experiences about disturbing or difficult moments of their lives. Most songs were written by Petrucci, "A Nightmare to Remember" was based on a childhood car incident; "The Count of Tuscany" was about an actual encounter he had in Tuscany; and "Wither" was about the process of songwriting for him. "The Best of Times" was written by Mike Portnoy about his father, who died from cancer. "I just wanted to write something that was a tribute to our life together," said Portnoy, who played the song for his father prior to his death. "The Shattered Fortress" is the final part of Portnoy's Twelve-step Suite, reprising and concluding themes and motifs from the suite that began on 2002's Six Degrees of Inner Turbulence album. The remaining song, "A Rite of Passage", concerns Freemasonry; a video of the edited single was released on May 8, 2009.

"Wither" was released as a single on September 15, 2009. In addition to the album version of the song, the single contained an alternate version featuring only a piano and vocals, a demo version with John Petrucci on vocals, and a demo version of "The Best of Times” with Mike Portnoy on vocals. There was also a video to follow it which was released on November 18, 2009.

== Reception ==
Professional ratings
Aggregate scores
Source	Rating
Metacritic	68/100
Review scores
Source	Rating
AllMusic	4/5 stars
Blistering	8/10 stars
The Metal Forge	7.5/10 stars
Metal Hammer	(positive)
Metal Review	8/10 stars
Metal Storm	7.5/10 stars
PopMatters	6/10
Record Collector	4/5 stars
Sputnikmusic	4/5 stars
411mania.com	9.5/10

Initial critical response to Black Clouds & Silver Linings was generally favorable. At Metacritic, which assigns a normalized rating out of 100 to reviews from mainstream critics, the album has received an average score of 68, based on five reviews. Rich Wilson, author of Lifting Shadows, previewed the album for Metal Hammer, calling the album "Dream Theater's finest and most balanced album in a decade." Eduardo Rivadavia of AllMusic gave the album four out of five stars writing, "Black Clouds & Silver Linings is still an archetypal Dream Theater album; one that's unlikely to broaden their audience all that much, but is conversely guaranteed to thrill their hardcore converts with its renewed devotion to the most exigent and stimulating facets of the band's chosen musical domain." Similarly David Buchanan of Consequence of Sound, an online music magazine, said: "that this release will not necessarily bring in new fans but will also not disappoint the current flock, and this is very true. There are no improvements, but no sheer letdowns, either." He gave the album four and a half stars out of five. The album was named as one of Classic Rock‘s 10 essential progressive rock albums of the decade.

The album debuted at No. 6 on the Billboard 200 selling 40,285 copies. It was the first time in the band's history that they had cracked the Top 10 on that chart, and is currently the band's highest single week sales of an album. The album also debuted at No. 1 on Billboard Top Internet Albums, and No. 2 on Billboard Top Rock Albums. The album also marked the first time that the band hit the number one spot in Finland.

The album won a 2009 Metal Storm Award for Best Progressive Metal Album.

== Track listing ==
All tracks are written by John Petrucci, Mike Portnoy, Jordan Rudess and John Myung except where noted, per album liner notes.

No.	Title	Lyrics	Length
1.	"A Nightmare to Remember"	Petrucci	16:10
2.	"A Rite of Passage"	Petrucci	8:36
3.	"Wither" (music: Petrucci)	Petrucci	5:25
4.	"The Shattered Fortress": "X. Restraint"; "XI. Receive"; "XII. Responsible"	Portnoy	12:49
5.	"The Best of Times"	Portnoy	13:09
6.	"The Count of Tuscany"	Petrucci	19:16
Total length:			75:25

=== Special edition tracks ===
- The 3-disc Special Edition included a bonus disc of six cover songs, entitled "Uncovered 2008/2009". These tracks were originally released separately, one per week, in the weeks leading up to the album's release. "To Tame a Land" had been previously released on the 2008 Iron Maiden tribute album Maiden Heaven.

No.	Title	Writer(s)	Original artist	Length
1.	"Stargazer"	Ronnie James Dio, Ritchie Blackmore	Rainbow	8:10
2.	"Tenement Funster"/"Flick of the Wrist"/"Lily of the Valley"	Roger Taylor/Freddie Mercury/Mercury	Queen	8:17
3.	"Odyssey"	Steve Morse	Dixie Dregs	7:59
4.	"Take Your Fingers From My Hair"	Randy Jackson	Zebra	8:18
5.	"Larks' Tongues in Aspic, Part Two"	Robert Fripp	King Crimson	6:30
6.	"To Tame a Land"	Steve Harris	Iron Maiden	7:15
Total length:				46:29

- Also included in the three disc special edition are instrumental tracks of the songs, without overdubs or solos.

No.	Title	Length
1.	"A Nightmare to Remember"	15:39
2.	"A Rite of Passage"	8:36
3.	"Wither"	5:29
4.	"The Shattered Fortress"	12:47
5.	"The Best of Times"	13:20
6.	"The Count of Tuscany"	18:48
Total length:		74:39

=== Deluxe collector's edition box set ===
A deluxe collectors’-edition boxed set of the album was also released. Packaged in a silver foil embossed black velvet box the set includes the 3 Special Edition CDs, a 180-Gram Double LP, a DVD with isolated audio tracks for each instrument, a lithograph of the album cover, with only 100 being signed by Hugh Syme, and a mouse pad. Those who pre-ordered were able to download a newly recorded cover song each week beginning on May 19, 2009, until the album's release. 100 box sets contained a "silver ticket" entitling the purchaser and one guest to a meet-and-greet with the band. This version was also a Limited Edition release, only 14,000 were made.

== Personnel ==
Dream Theater

- James LaBrie – lead vocals
- John Myung – bass
- John Petrucci – guitar, backing vocals, production
- Mike Portnoy – drums, percussion, backing vocals, co-lead vocals ("The Shattered Fortress"), harsh vocals ("A Nightmare to Remember"), production
- Jordan Rudess – keyboards, Continuum ("A Nightmare to Remember", "The Shattered Fortress"), iPhone app Bebot ("A Rite of Passage"), lap steel guitar ("A Nightmare to Remember")

Additional Personnel

- Jerry Goodman – violin ("The Best of Times", "Odyssey", "Larks' Tongues in Aspic, Part Two")

Production

- Paul Northfield – engineering, mixing, vocal track co-producer
- Dr. Rick Kwan – assistant engineering
- Leon Zervos – mastering
- Hugh Syme – art direction, design, illustrations
- Dan Mandell – photography

== Charts ==
Chart (2009)	Peak position
Australian Albums (ARIA)	16
Austrian Albums (Ö3 Austria)	18
Belgian Albums (Ultratop Flanders)	36
Belgian Albums (Ultratop Wallonia)	34
Canadian Albums (Billboard)	6
Czech Albums (ČNS IFPI)	14
Danish Albums (Hitlisten)	26
Dutch Albums (Album Top 100)	3
Europe (European Top 100 Albums)	1
Finnish Albums (Suomen virallinen lista)	1
French Albums (SNEP)	9
German Albums Chart (Offizielle Top 100)	3
Hungarian Albums (MAHASZ)	1
Irish Albums (IRMA)	91
Italian Albums (FIMI)	5
Japanese Albums (Oricon)	8
Mexican Albums (Top 100 Mexico)	7
Norwegian Albums (VG-lista)	7
Polish Albums (ZPAV)	4
Portuguese Albums (AFP)	14
Scottish Albums (OCC)	15
Spanish Albums (PROMUSICAE)	13
Swedish Albums (Sverigetopplistan)	3
Swiss Albums (Schweizer Hitparade)	9
UK Albums (OCC)	23
US Billboard 200	6
