= The Astonishing =

Studio album by Dream Theater
- Released: January 29, 2016
- Recorded: January–June, August–September 2015
- Studios: Cove City Sound Studios, Glen Cove, New York; The Samurai Hotel, Astoria, New York; Street of Dreams, Toronto, Ontario, Canada; CNSO, Prague
- Genres: Progressive rock; progressive metal
- Length: 130:23
- Label: Roadrunner
- Producer: John Petrucci

Dream Theater chronology
Breaking the Fourth Wall (2014)	The Astonishing (2016)	Distance Over Time (2019)

Singles from The Astonishing
- 1. "The Gift of Music" Released: December 3, 2015; 2. "Moment of Betrayal" Released: January 22, 2016; 3. "Our New World (ft. Lzzy Hale)" Released: September 9, 2016

The Astonishing is the thirteenth studio album by American progressive metal band Dream Theater, released on January 29, 2016, through Roadrunner Records, which was their final release through the label. It is the band's second concept album, with a story conceived by guitarist John Petrucci and music written by Petrucci and keyboardist Jordan Rudess. Composer David Campbell assisted with orchestrating the album's strings and choirs. The band recorded their parts for the album throughout 2015 at Cove City Sound Studios on Long Island, New York, with the exception of vocals, which were recorded in Canada. Mixing and sound engineering were performed by the band's longtime collaborator, Richard Chycki, with Petrucci producing.

The Astonishing is set in a dystopian future United States and follows the Ravenskill Rebel Militia in their efforts to defy the Great Northern Empire of the Americas using the magical power of music. It was inspired by contemporary fantasy and science fiction franchises such as Game of Thrones and Star Wars, as well as Petrucci's observations on the ubiquity of technological automation in modern-day society. In their effort to match the album's narrative, Dream Theater wrote songs in a wide variety of styles ranging from mellow ballads to their more conventional progressive metal sound.

Leading up to The Astonishing's release, the band marketed the album with its own website, fan mailing lists, and trailer. It debuted in the top ten of nine countries and became the first Dream Theater album to reach number one on the US Billboard Rock Chart. It has received generally favorable reviews from music critics, and the band toured to support the album throughout most of 2016.

== Background ==
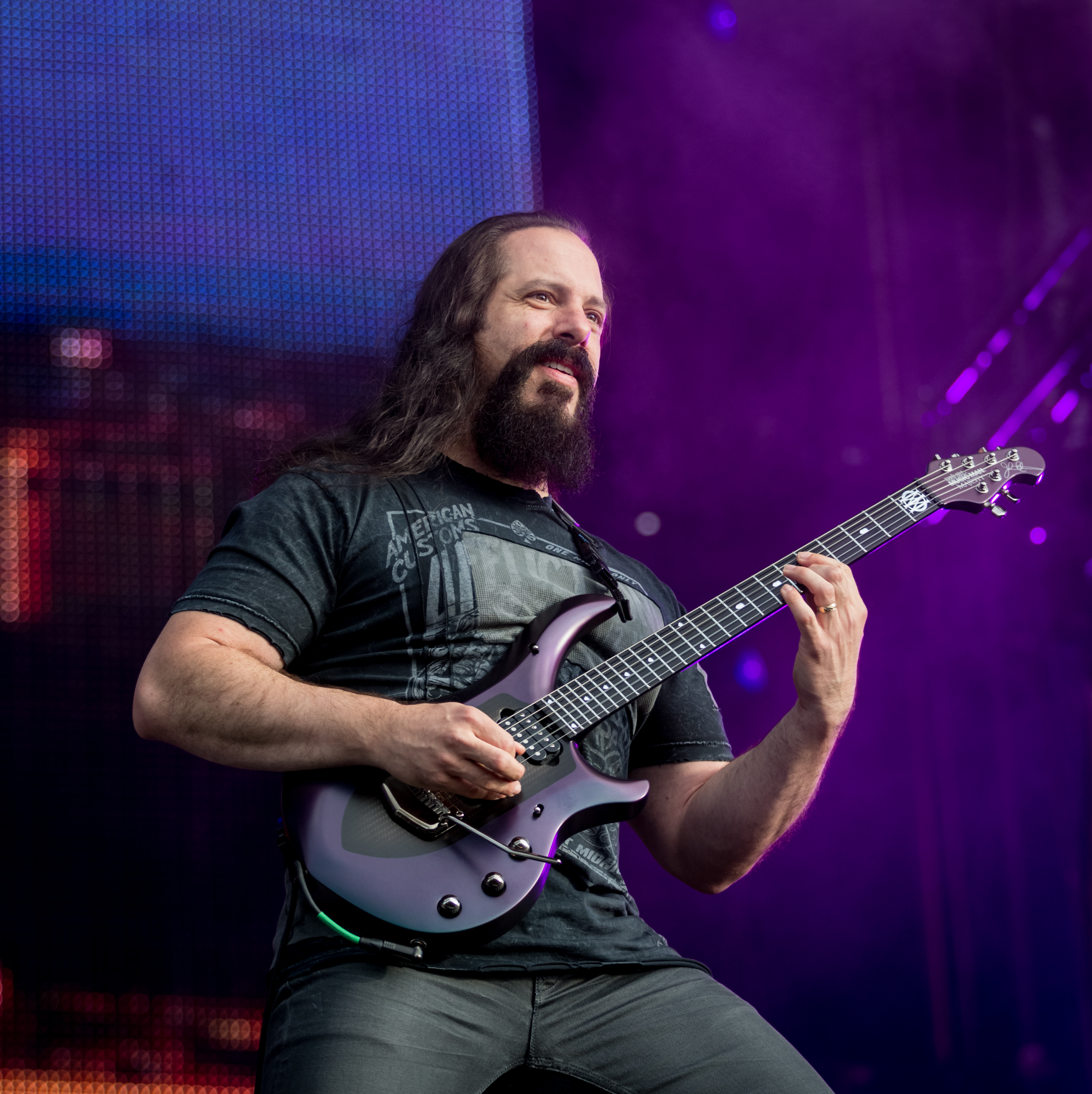
John Petrucci wrote The Astonishing's story, co-wrote the album's music, and served as its producer.

In mid-2013, guitarist John Petrucci began writing a story for a concept album, presenting it to the rest of Dream Theater about a year later. The band and the record label were receptive to the idea, with Petrucci recalling, "Everybody had the 'go for it' mentality. And from the very first meeting that we had with Dave Rath at Roadrunner, when I presented this and even just said the title, he was 100 percent on board. The involvement of everybody at Roadrunner has been absolutely unbelievable, so supportive. It kind of ignited the secret nerd in all of us that loves this sort of stuff, because it's fun, it's different." From its conception, Petrucci envisioned the story as eventually being re-worked into a film, play, or video game.

Petrucci and keyboardist Jordan Rudess wrote the album's music independently from the rest of Dream Theater by getting together every day, going over ideas in the morning, and then working through the music during the day and night. Upon finishing their initial drafts, they presented them to the rest of the band, who worked on writing parts for their own instruments. In an interview with Artisan News, drummer Mike Mangini reflected, "The biggest challenge for me was interpreting the initial music that was given to me, because there were no drums. So [I was like], 'All right, I need to listen to this, really, as a whole piece to understand where I should kind of let loose or I should lay back a lot.' All that. Just to see it as a whole, 'cause I don't wanna play blindly or try to fit too much where it doesn't belong."

As Petrucci and Rudess felt that the album needed real string lines and choirs, as well as other organic sounds, they enlisted the help of veteran composer David Campbell to assist with aspects of the orchestration and handle the logistics of recording all of the necessary musicians. Reflecting on the process for Keyboard, Rudess explained, "Our initial thought was, let’s do it all on rock instruments and let David arrange it, but that wasn’t really thinking ahead in terms of who we are. When we go into the studio, we tend to work on things until they’re pretty polished. So we got into what we called pre-orchestrating. I’d use any sound at my disposal to place strings where we wanted to hear strings, choir where we wanted choir, and so forth—but without getting overly specific about a certain patch or instrument library being the one, because we knew it was all going to be replaced with real players." Once the album's arrangements were complete, they were performed and recorded in studios around the world, with Campbell conducting and leading the sessions from Los Angeles.

Dream Theater began recording the album's bass, drums, guitars, and keyboards in January 2015 at Cove City Sound Studios in Long Island, New York, where they also recorded three of their previous albums, A Dramatic Turn of Events (2011) and Dream Theater (2013), and Train Of Thought (2003). Longtime collaborator Richard Chycki, who Petrucci described as "a sixth member of the band", was again brought in as the album's sound engineer, while Petrucci served as producer. In July, they took a break from the studio to play some shows in Europe, but did some writing while on the road. In August, James LaBrie began recording vocals in Canada with Chycki. Singing as multiple characters, he took it upon himself to create unique interpretations of each one, with Petrucci offering him sporadic advice and feedback. Recording completed in late September, with mixing beginning the next month and mastering concluding in mid-December.

== Synopsis ==
The Astonishing is set in a futuristic society where music is created by Noise Machines (NOMACS) instead of humans.

The following is based on The Astonishing's official synopsis, published by Dream Theater upon the album's release.

=== Act 1 ===
In 2285, the northeastern region of the United States has turned into a dystopia ruled by the oppressive Great Northern Empire of the Americas. The only resemblance to entertainment that exists is the electronic noise of the Noise Machines (NOMACS). The empire is ruled by Emperor Nafaryus, Empress Arabelle, Crown Prince Daryus, and Princess Faythe. In a distant village called Ravenskill, a man named Gabriel possesses the natural ability to make music and sing ("The Gift of Music"). He has an older brother, Commander Arhys of the Ravenskill Rebel Militia, who has a son, Xander, with his deceased wife, Evangeline ("A Better Life").

Nafaryus hears a rumor about Gabriel being the savior of the people. He and his family travel to Ravenskill to see him for themselves ("Lord Nafaryus"). In the Ravenskill town square, Gabriel is performing for the people when the royal family shows up. He continues playing at the emperor's request ("A Savior in the Square"), nearly bringing them all to tears ("When Your Time Has Come"). As he plays, Faythe remembers how she found a music player when she was a child and kept it a secret all her life, and as she and Gabriel stare at each other and fall in love ("Act of Faythe"). Nafaryus, though briefly moved by Gabriel's song, sees him as a threat to his rule and gives the people of the town three days to deliver their savior to him or he will destroy the town ("Three Days"). Arhys hides his brother and refuses to give him up ("Brother, Can You Hear Me?").

Back at the Emperor's palace, Faythe decides that she must see Gabriel again. Disguising herself, she begins to travel back to Ravenskill. Arabelle, knowing about her daughter's intentions, instructs Daryus to follow and protect her. Daryus feels he has always been overlooked by his father in favor of his sister, so he travels to the town with his own intentions ("A Life Left Behind"). Faythe arrives in the town and finds Xander, who trusts her and leads her to his father Arhys. Faythe convinces Arhys that she can help, so he brings her to Gabriel's hideout. Gabriel and Faythe embrace, and she tells him that she believes she can convince her father to give up his hunt for Gabriel ("Ravenskill"). Gabriel tells her that if he could just meet with the Emperor, he could inspire him to restore peace to the land using his gift of music ("Chosen").

Meanwhile, Daryus finds Arhys' home and takes Xander captive. Daryus promises he will guarantee the safety and wealth of Xander in return for Arhys bringing Gabriel to him. Daryus does this hoping that it will gain him respect from his father ("A Tempting Offer"). Arhys is forced to agree to the deal, remembering a promise he made to Evangeline to protect their son ("The X Aspect"). Faythe travels back to her father's palace and learns that her music player once belonged to her father. After a while, Nafaryus bows to the pleas of his daughter ("A New Beginning") and agrees to meet with Gabriel at an abandoned amphitheater called Heaven's Cove ("The Road to Revolution").

=== Act 2 ===
Arhys informs Daryus that Gabriel will be at Heaven's Cove that night ("Moment of Betrayal"). While the meeting time approaches ("Heaven's Cove"), Faythe decides that she wants to use the power of her royal status to change the world for good ("Begin Again"). At the amphitheater, Arhys changes his mind on the deal, and when Daryus shows up, they start a fight. Daryus overpowers Arhys and kills him ("The Path That Divides"), unaware that Xander followed them and saw the whole scene. As Xander runs to his father's dead body, Daryus sees the silhouette of someone approaching him. Assuming it to be Gabriel, he attempts to kill him, realising too late that it is actually Faythe ("The Walking Shadow"). Gabriel arrives at the scene and sees his dead brother and the dying Faythe. Covering Xander's ears, he unleashes a scream that causes Daryus to go deaf and that is heard by Nafaryus, Arabelle, and the entire town ("My Last Farewell").

Nafaryus and Arabelle arrive and beg Gabriel to use his gift to save Faythe ("Losing Faythe"), but Gabriel is unable to sing after screaming so loudly ("Whispers on the Wind"). The people, attracted by the scream, show up and start singing, giving Gabriel hope. He finds his ability to sing and brings Faythe back to life ("Hymn of a Thousand Voices"). Nafaryus, realising what he has done, decides to end the conflict with Gabriel and shuts down the NOMACS for good. Daryus is forgiven for his actions, and Gabriel and Faythe raise Xander as a family ("Our New World"). Nafaryus promises to govern the empire as a fair leader in a new world where music is appreciated again ("Astonishing").

== Composition ==
The Astonishing is Dream Theater's second concept album, after 1999's Metropolis Pt. 2: Scenes from a Memory. It was described as an "honest-to-God rock opera" by Rolling Stone, and has been compared to The Who's Tommy (1969), Rush's 2112 (1976), Pink Floyd's The Wall (1979), and Queensrÿche's Operation: Mindcrime (1988). 2112 also revolves around music being used to achieve freedom in a futuristic setting. The album's story was inspired by Petrucci's love of fantasy and science fiction franchises such as Game of Thrones, The Lord of the Rings, and Star Wars, as well as his observations on the role of technology in modern-day society. In an interview with Billboard, he explained, “I was thinking of all of the things now that people used to do that they don’t do anymore because they’re automated or done by robots: lots of jobs, self-driving cars coming right around the corner ... My thought was, 'What would happen if ... music [became] all artificial?’”

Clocking in at over two hours in length and containing 34 tracks, The Astonishing is Dream Theater's longest album and was planned as an immersive experience that would be best enjoyed as a full album as opposed to a collection of singles. The album plays out similarly to a film, with Loudwire observing, "It’s an enormous amount of music to absorb in one sitting, but when you think about it, most movies are around two hours in length, and The Astonishing is very much like a movie in the way it delivers the storyline." Certain songs, such as "A Savior in the Square" and "Our New World", have reoccurring themes, while others stand more on their own in order to move the plot along.

In writing music to match The Astonishing's narrative, Dream Theater ended up playing in a wide variety of styles, from cinematic instrumentals to mellow ballads to the band's more conventional progressive metal. Compared to previous Dream Theater albums, there is more acoustic playing, both in terms of guitar and piano. In an interview with Ultimate Guitar, Petrucci specifically mentioned the song "A Life Left Behind", recalling, "[It] starts with an acoustic, kind of proggy riff, which is something we've never done and has a very Yes sort of feel." Several songs introduced new elements to the band's music, such as "The X Aspect", which is the first Dream Theater song to use bagpipes, and "Three Days", which features a saloon-style swing section that was written as a juxtaposition to the bleaker aspects of the album's story. Five of the album's tracks are short, electronic songs that represent the music of NOMACS.

== Release ==
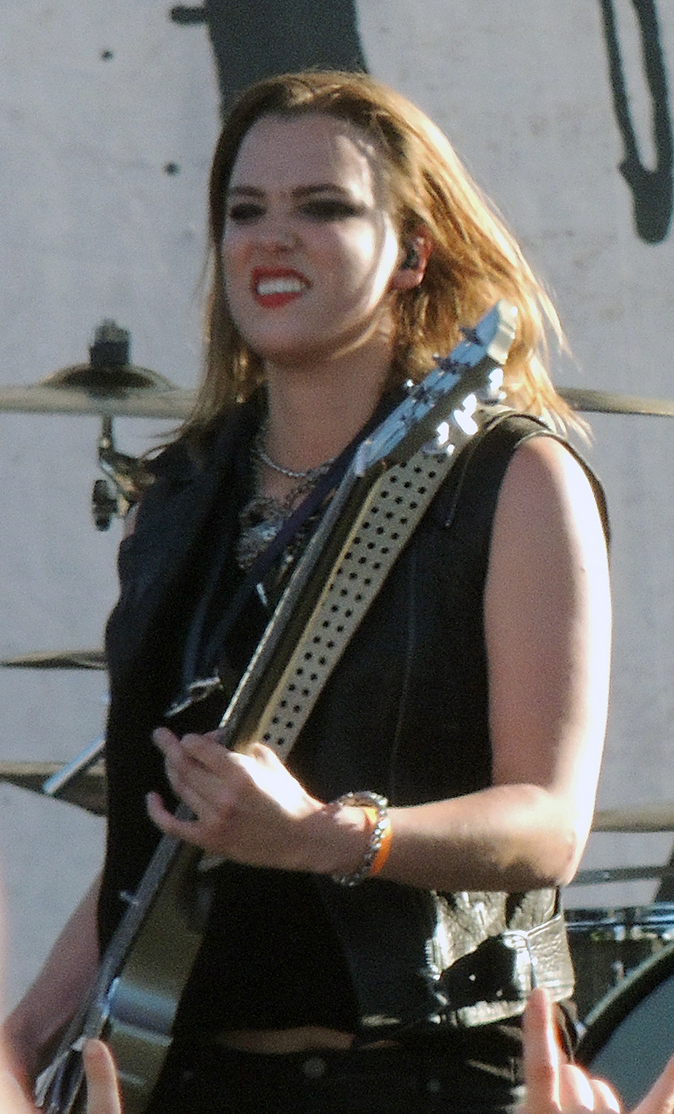
Halestorm's Lzzy Hale sang guest vocals on the "Our New World" single.

Dream Theater began their marketing campaign for The Astonishing in October 2015, prompting visitors to visit their official website to choose between mailing lists for the Great Northern Empire or the Ravenskill Rebel Militia. Registrants were then notified of updates to their side's Twitter page as they occurred. In early November, the band announced that their thirteenth studio album would be titled The Astonishing and launched a promotional website that suggested it would be a concept album. The website slowly revealed key elements of the album's story, including its characters, map, and track listing. In December, The Astonishing was given an official January 29 release date, with multiple special editions being made available for pre-sale including a deluxe set with a handmade NOMAC 3D model. Leading to the album's release, the band released a single, "The Gift of Music", on December 15, and premiered another song, "Moment of Betrayal", on January 21. Additionally, an official trailer for the album was made available on YouTube.

Upon its release, The Astonishing debuted on many album charts, including top-ten placements in Norway, Hungary, Italy, Sweden, Portugal, the Netherlands, Germany, Austria, and Canada. In the United States, it entered and peaked on the Billboard 200 at number eleven overall and became Dream Theater's first ever number one debut on the Billboard Rock Chart. In February, the band released a music video for "The Gift of Music", which mixed live performance footage with CGI animation and was filmed in New Jersey. Later that month, the band announced that it had partnered with Turbo Tape Games to create a video game adaptation of the album's story for PC, Mac, iOS and Android. On May 7, a music video was released for "Our New World", followed by a video of tour visuals for "Hymn of a Thousand Voices" on June 14. On September 10, an alternate version of "Our New World" was released as a single, featuring guest vocalist Lzzy Hale of Halestorm.

== Reception ==
Professional ratings
Aggregate scores
Source	Rating
Metacritic	80/100
Review scores
Source	Rating
AllMusic	4/5 stars
Blabbermouth.net	8/10 stars
Classic Rock	4/5 stars
Consequence of Sound	B−
Kerrang!	4/5 stars
Loudwire	Positive
Metal Hammer	8/10 stars
Record Collector	5/5 stars
Rolling Stone	3.5/5 stars
RTÉ.ie	4/5 stars

Upon release, The Astonishing received generally favorable reviews from music publications. At Metacritic, which assigns a normalized rating out of 100 to reviews from mainstream publications, the album holds an average score of 80, based on six reviews. Critics were especially complimentary of the band's willingness to write a long, unconventional album, with AllMusic commenting, "Dream Theater have invested in the 'album' concept (and in listeners' attention spans) even as the music biz doubles down on the notion that long-players are merely envelopes to hold singles." Rolling Stone echoed these sentiments, concluding, "The results won't please every Dream Theater partisan, nor will they convert the skeptical. But it would take a hard heart to deny Petrucci, co-composer and keyboardist Jordan Rudess and their mates credit for the boldness of their aspirations and the assurance with which they achieve them." Loudwire was also supportive of the band's unique approach, but warned that it might make the album polarizing for fans.

Some reviewers were critical of The Astonishing's concept, including Consequence of Sound, who described it as "very silly", but ultimately gave the album an overall positive review. By contrast, Record Collector described the storytelling as "seamless". In their write-up, RTÉ.ie advised, "park the snootiness before pressing the play button because while The Astonishing makes Iron Maiden's recent 92-minute double The Book of Souls look like a Ramones record, it's great fun ... Mental elbow grease is required, and the quintet wouldn't have it any other way."

LaBrie's vocals on The Astonishing were singled out by many critics as being particularly strong. In their review, Loudwire elaborated, "A concept album with different characters puts a lot of pressure on the vocalist, and James LaBrie lives up to the challenge. From mellow crooning to Broadway belting to edgier singing, he utilizes every style in his arsenal and delivers a first-class performance." The band as a whole were also praised, although AllMusic observed that Mangini and bassist John Myung weren't featured as prominently as usual.

In retrospect, Dream Theater have observed that fan response to The Astonishing was mixed, which the band anticipated would be the case because of the unique nature of the project. In an interview with Eddie Trunk, John Petrucci explained, "[The album] was so immersed in the story — everything had to do with that — that there was no question that it was gonna alienate certain people that weren't on board with it. And that's exactly what happened. So some people really were, 'This is the coolest thing ever' and got into it, got into the whole story and the theatrics. And some people were, like, 'Ehhh, I want normal Dream Theater.'" James LaBrie similarly remarked, "When you do something that daring and when you do something that bold and experimental, it's bound to bring along some criticism with it."

=== Supporting tour ===
In November 2015, Dream Theater announced some European tour dates for early 2016. The next month, they announced North American tour dates beginning in April and ending in May. As the band felt that The Astonishing would lend itself well to a live performance, they decided to play the album in full for each show and hired a production company to help with their presentation. They also made it a point to book historical concert halls and theaters such as Radio City Music Hall. Following the conclusion of the North American leg, the band moved on to South America before returning to the United States for another run of shows, officially wrapping up the tour in December 2016.

== Track listing ==
All lyrics written by John Petrucci, all music composed by Petrucci and Jordan Rudess.

Act 1
No.	Title	Length
1.	"Descent of the NOMACS"	1:10
2.	"Dystopian Overture" (instrumental)	4:50
3.	"The Gift of Music"	4:00
4.	"The Answer"	1:52
5.	"A Better Life"	4:39
6.	"Lord Nafaryus"	3:28
7.	"A Savior in the Square"	4:13
8.	"When Your Time Has Come"	4:19
9.	"Act of Faythe"	5:00
10.	"Three Days"	3:44
11.	"The Hovering Sojourn"	0:27
12.	"Brother, Can You Hear Me?"	5:11
13.	"A Life Left Behind"	5:49
14.	"Ravenskill"	6:01
15.	"Chosen"	4:32
16.	"A Tempting Offer"	4:19
17.	"Digital Discord"	0:47
18.	"The X Aspect"	4:13
19.	"A New Beginning"	7:40
20.	"The Road to Revolution"	3:35
Total length:		79:49

Act 2
No.	Title	Length
1.	"2285 Entr'acte" (instrumental)	2:20
2.	"Moment of Betrayal"	6:11
3.	"Heaven's Cove"	4:19
4.	"Begin Again"	3:54
5.	"The Path That Divides"	5:09
6.	"Machine Chatter"	1:03
7.	"The Walking Shadow"	2:58
8.	"My Last Farewell"	3:44
9.	"Losing Faythe"	4:13
10.	"Whispers on the Wind"	1:37
11.	"Hymn of a Thousand Voices"	3:38
12.	"Our New World"	4:12
13.	"Power Down"	1:25
14.	"Astonishing"	5:51
Total length:		50:34; Both Acts: 130:23

Notes:

- Tracks 1, 11 and 17 from Act 1, and tracks 6 and 13 from Act 2 are NOMACS instrumentals.

== Personnel ==
All credits taken from The Astonishing liner notes.

Dream Theater

- James LaBrie – lead vocals
- John Petrucci – guitars, production, story and concept
- Jordan Rudess – keyboards, synthesizer, arrangement, creative direction
- John Myung – bass
- Mike Mangini – drums, percussion

Additional musicians

- Eric Rigler – bagpipes on "The X Aspect"
- FILMharmonic Orchestra Prague
- Pueri Cantores – boys' choir
- Millennium Choir
- Fred Martin and The Levite Camp – gospel choir

Production

- Richard Chycki – engineering, mixing, voice of Lord Nafaryus(note: Chycki is also credited in the liner notes for spoken parts of Lord Nafaryus, but these never featured on the album proper, only during the tour for the album, opening the show)
- Jie Ma – cover art
- Sean Mosher-Smith – cover art direction
- David Campbell – orchestral and choir arrangements
- Richard Flocca – conducting
- Petr Pycha – orchestra contractor
- Mike Schuppan – engineering
- Travis Warner – engineering
- Gary Chester – engineering
- James "Jimmy T" Meslin – assistant engineer
- Dave Rowland – assistant mixer
- Jason Stanniulis – assistant mixer
- Brandon Williams – music editing and coordination
- Ted Jensen – mastering

== Charts ==
=== Weekly charts ===
Chart (2016)	Peak position
Australian Albums (ARIA)	10
Austrian Albums (Ö3 Austria)	6
Brazilian Albums (ABPD)	7
Belgian Albums (Ultratop Flanders)	12
Belgian Albums (Ultratop Wallonia)	16
Canadian Albums (Billboard)	8
Czech Albums (ČNS IFPI)	1
Danish Albums (Hitlisten)	37
Dutch Albums (Album Top 100)	4
Finnish Albums (Suomen virallinen lista)	2
French Albums (SNEP)	13
German Albums (Offizielle Top 100)	5
Greek Albums (IFPI)	7
Hungarian Albums (MAHASZ)	2
Irish Albums (IRMA)	87
Italian Albums (FIMI)	3
Japanese Albums (Oricon)	10
New Zealand Albums (RMNZ)	17
Norwegian Albums (VG-lista)	2
Polish Albums (ZPAV)	11
Portuguese Albums (AFP)	3
South Korean Albums (Gaon)	24
South Korean Albums International (Gaon)	1
Scottish Albums (Official Charts)	10
Spanish Albums (Promusicae)	8
Swedish Albums (Sverigetopplistan)	3
Swiss Albums (Schweizer Hitparade)	5
Taiwanese Albums (Five Music)	7
UK Albums (Official Charts)	11
UK Rock & Metal Albums (Official Charts)	1
US Billboard 200	11
US Top Hard Rock Albums (Billboard)	1

=== Year-end charts ===
Chart (2016)	Peak position
Italian Albums (FIMI)	98
