= Mike Mangini =

American drummer

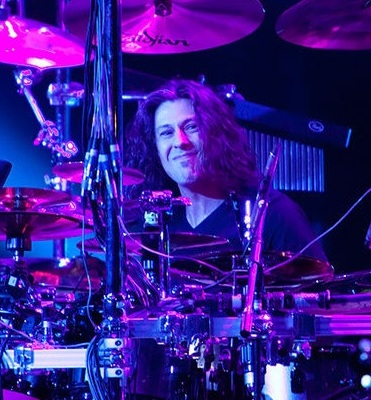
- Mangini in 2011

Background information
- Born: Michael Anthony Mangini; April 18, 1963 (age 63); Newton, Massachusetts, U.S.
- Genres: Progressive metal; heavy metal; thrash metal; funk metal; progressive rock; instrumental rock; hard rock
- Occupation: Drummer
- Years active: 1987–present
- Member of: Monolith; Godsmack
- Formerly of: Steve Vai; Extreme; Annihilator; James LaBrie; Tribe of Judah; Dave Reffett; G3; Dream Theater
- Website: mikemangini.com

Michael Anthony Mangini (born April 18, 1963) is an American musician, best known for his tenure with the progressive metal band Dream Theater, with whom he performed from 2010 to 2023. He is currently the touring drummer for alt/nü-metal band Godsmack. He has also played with artists and bands including Annihilator, Extreme, James LaBrie and Steve Vai. Before joining Dream Theater, Mangini was a faculty member at Berklee College of Music. Between 2002 and 2005, he set five World's Fastest Drummer records. He also appeared on the Discovery Channel series Time Warp, where his drumming was captured with high-speed cameras.

== Early life and career ==
Mangini first started playing the drums when he was two and a half years old, being inspired by Ringo Starr of The Beatles. He would mimic Buddy Rich performances. Other influences include Bobby Colomby, Danny Seraphine, John Bonham, Neil Peart and Terry Bozzio.

After graduating, from Waltham Senior High School in 1981, Mangini put aside his music studies to pursue a computer science major at Bentley University. After graduating, he started programming software for the Patriot Missile program.

In 1987, Mangini scored one of his first high-profile gigs, playing drums for Boston's Rick Berlin Band. This would be his first collaboration with bassist Philip Bynoe.

In 1991, Mangini joined the thrash metal band Annihilator, playing drums on several tracks for the band's album Set the World on Fire. He went on to tour with the band in support of this album until 1994. That year, he joined Boston hard rock band Extreme, replacing original drummer Paul Geary. Mangini played on three songs on Extreme's 1995 album Waiting for the Punchline, and appeared with the band on the Late Show with David Letterman.

After Extreme disbanded in 1996, Mike was informed through drummer Jonathan Mover that guitarist Steve Vai was auditioning drummers for his live band. Mike successfully auditioned for Vai's band and relocated to Los Angeles. From late 1996 to early 2000, Mangini was drummer of Vai's live ensemble, which also included bassist Philip Bynoe, guitarist Mike Keneally and beginning in 2000, guitarist Dave Weiner. Mangini appeared on Vai's studio albums Fire Garden and The Ultra Zone, and the live album Alive in an Ultra World.

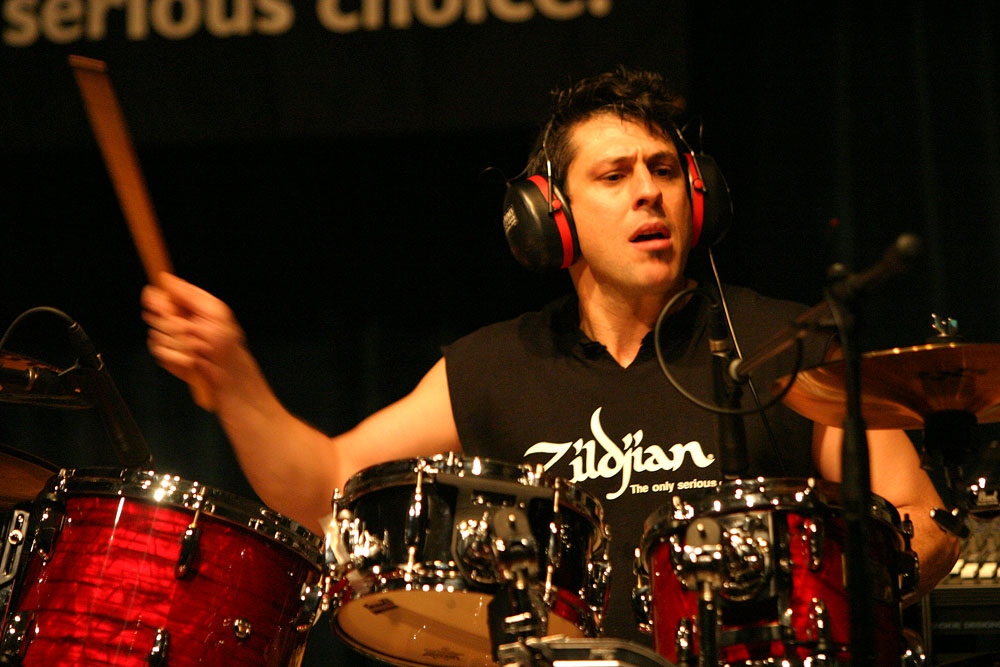
Mangini in 2004

During a hiatus on Vai's Ultra Zone tour in 2000, Mangini returned to Boston, where he served as an associate professor at Berklee College of Music. He also formed the short-lived band Tribe of Judah with former Extreme frontman Gary Cherone and bassist Pat Badger. Mangini appeared on his second and third Annihilator albums titled All for You and Metal, respectively.

In 2005, Mangini accepted a full-time teaching position at the Berklee College of Music in the Percussion Department. He resigned in 2010 after joining Dream Theater.

Mike played drums for the band Into The Great Divide on their self titled album released in 2018. The album is all instrumental and has many similarities to his former band Dream Theater.

In 2023, Mike released his first solo album, Invisible Signs, under the name Mangini.

In 2025, Mike's new band, Monolith, released three singles, "Oligarch," "Mother Martyr," and "Gooru."

== Dream Theater ==
In late 2010, Mangini auditioned to succeed Mike Portnoy as the drummer for Dream Theater. He had previously appeared on three solo albums by Dream Theater's lead singer, James LaBrie. Mangini was announced as Dream Theater's new drummer on April 29, 2011, several months after he actually joined. He appeared on every Dream Theater release from 2011's A Dramatic Turn of Events to 2021's A View from the Top of the World. Distance over Time, Mangini's fourth studio album with Dream Theater, featured his debut as a lyricist, on the song "Room 137".

On October 25, 2023, Dream Theater announced that Mangini was leaving the band and that their former drummer Mike Portnoy was returning in his place. The departure was amicable, as Mangini stated that his tenure was "an intense and rewarding experience" and that he was grateful to have had "experience playing music with these iconic musicians, as well as some fun times laced with humor."

== Other projects ==
Mangini served as the drummer for Dream Theater bandmate John Petrucci on the G3 tour, along with bassist Dave LaRue, in 2012 and 2018.

In 2015, Mangini joined progressive rock band U.K. for their Final World Tour.

On June 12, 2026, Mangini made his debut with Godsmack at Morton Amphitheater in Riverside, MO.

== Gear ==
Mike plays and endorses Pearl drums, hardware and percussion.

He also plays and endorses Zildjian cymbals, Vater drumsticks, Remo drumheads and Shure microphones.

== Discography ==
=== Selected album appearances ===
Annihilator

- Set the World on Fire (1993)
- All for You (2004)
- Metal (2007)

Extreme

- Waiting for the Punchline (1995) – tracks "Hip Today", "Leave Me Alone" and "No Respect"

Nuno Bettencourt

- Schizophonic (1997) – tracks "Swollen Princess" and "Fine By Me"

Mike Keneally

- Sluggo! (1997) – track "Egg Zooming"

Steve Vai

- Fire Garden (1996) – tracks "Bangkok" and "The Fire Garden Suite"
- G3: Live in Concert (1996)
- Merry Axemas – A Guitar Christmas (1997) – track "Christmas Time is Here"
- The Ultra Zone (1999) – tracks "Jibboom", "Windows to the Soul" and "Here I Am"
- Alive in an Ultra World (2001)
- The Story of Light (2012) – track "The Moon and I"
- Modern Primitive (2016) – track "Never Forever"

MullMuzzler/James LaBrie

- Keep It to Yourself (1999)
- James LaBrie's MullMuzzler 2 (2001)
- Elements of Persuasion (2005)

Sal DiFusco

- Nevertheless (2000)
- Great Exploits (2002)
- Vanishing Mist (2008)

Tribe of Judah

- Exit Elvis (2002)

Mike Visconti

- Take 3 (1999)
- In Other Words (2003)
- Boston Accent (2007)

Tim Donahue

- Madmen & Sinners (2004)

Rush Tribute

- Subdivisions (2005)

Shredding the Envelope

- The Call of the Flames (2009)

Daniel Pique

- Boo!! (2009)

Dream Theater

- A Dramatic Turn of Events (2011)
- Dream Theater (2013)
- Live at Luna Park (2013)
- Breaking the Fourth Wall (2014)
- The Astonishing (2016)
- Distance Over Time (2019)
- Distant Memories – Live in London (2020)
- A View from the Top of the World (2021)

Into the Great Divide

- Into the Great Divide (2018)

Rob Silverman

- Drumology II (2022) – track "Victory"

Bill Lonero

- Slather (2003) – track "Sidesteppin’"

Cross Country Driver

- The New Truth (2023) – tracks "Wild Child", "Rio Tularosa" and "Shine"

Mangini

- Invisible Signs (2023)
