= Distance Over Time =

2019 studio album by Dream Theater

Studio album by Dream Theater
- Released: February 22, 2019
- Recorded: June–September 2018
- Studios: Yonderbarn Studios in Monticello, New York and Mixland Studios, Midhurst, Canada (vocals only)
- Genre: Progressive metal
- Length: 56:51
- Label: Inside Out
- Producer: John Petrucci

Dream Theater chronology
The Astonishing (2016)	Distance Over Time (2019)	Distant Memories – Live in London (2020)

Singles from Distance Over Time
- 1. "Untethered Angel" Released: December 7, 2018; 2. "Fall into the Light" Released: January 11, 2019; 3. "Paralyzed" Released: February 8, 2019; 4. "Barstool Warrior" Released: August 21, 2019; 5. "At Wit's End" Released: December 2, 2019

Distance Over Time is the fourteenth studio album by American progressive metal band Dream Theater, released on February 22, 2019, and the band's first release on Inside Out Music. Distance Over Time was announced alongside a tour of North America during which Dream Theater would support the new album and celebrate the 20th anniversary of its fifth studio album, Metropolis Pt. 2: Scenes from a Memory (1999). On December 7, 2018, the lead single "Untethered Angel" and its music video were released. The second single, "Fall into the Light", was released on January 11, 2019. The third single, "Paralyzed", and its accompanying video were released on February 8, 2019. It is the band's most successful album chart-wise to date, taking top 10 positions in 19 countries (including going to number one in Germany and Switzerland).

== Background and composition ==
Musically, Dream Theater decided to create a "tight and focused" album with a heavier sound than its previous album, The Astonishing (2016). "At Wit's End" was the first piece that was written and the writing process for the whole album took 18 days, making Distance Over Time their fastest written album to date. The band compared the speed and style of Distance Over Time's writing process to that of its 2003 album, Train of Thought.

Dream Theater recorded the album in a cabin in Monticello, New York.

At just under 57 minutes long, not including a bonus track, Distance Over Time is Dream Theater's first studio album with a run time under one hour in length since 1992's Images and Words, and their shortest since the band's 1989 debut, When Dream and Day Unite. It is Dream Theater's third studio album to not feature any songs longer than ten minutes, after When Dream and Day Unite and 2016's The Astonishing.

"Room 137" is Dream Theater's only song with lyrics written by Mike Mangini.

== Critical reception ==
Professional ratings
Aggregate scores
Source	Rating
Metacritic	82/100
Review scores
Source	Rating
AllMusic	4/5 stars
Blabbermouth.net	8/10
Classic Rock	8/10 stars
Consequence of Sound	A−
Distorted Sound	10/10 stars
Exclaim!	8/10
Metal Hammer	Positive
New Noise (magazine)	5/5 stars
RockNLoad	10/10 stars
Wall of Sound	7.5/10

Distance Over Time was met with critical acclaim; it received an average score of 82/100 from 6 reviews on Metacritic, indicating "universal acclaim". Writing for AllMusic, Thom Jurek praised the album as a reaffirmation of Dream Theater's identity and appreciated its degree of freshness and energy. Consequence of Sound reviewed Distance Over Time positively, stating that "Calling an hourlong album streamlined might seem strange, but that's exactly what Distance Over Time is compared to Dream Theater's last release, 2016's 34-song, two hour and ten minute opus The Astonishing. Though the length is certainly shorter this time around, Dream Theater's expansive arrangements and complex songwriting haven't been scaled back on their 14th studio album.” Kerrang! said, "Sacrificing none of that trademark musicianship, this is Dream Theater at their most accessible, and they lose nothing for it".

On the day of its release, Distance Over Time reached the top spot on iTunes' Top 100 Albums list. Loudwire named it one of the 50 best metal albums of 2019.

== Track listing ==
All music is composed by John Petrucci, John Myung, Jordan Rudess and Mike Mangini

Standard edition track listing; lyrics credits per liner notes
No.	Title	Lyrics	Length
1.	"Untethered Angel"	Petrucci	6:14
2.	"Paralyzed"	Petrucci	4:17
3.	"Fall into the Light"	Myung, Petrucci	7:04
4.	"Barstool Warrior"	Petrucci	6:43
5.	"Room 137"	Mike Mangini	4:23
6.	"S2N"	Myung, Petrucci	6:21
7.	"At Wit's End"	James LaBrie	9:20
8.	"Out of Reach"	LaBrie	4:04
9.	"Pale Blue Dot"	Petrucci	8:25
Total length:			56:51

Limited edition bonus track
No.	Title	Lyrics	Length
10.	"Viper King"	LaBrie	4:00
Total length:			60:57

== Personnel ==
Credits adapted from Distance Over Time liner notes

Dream Theater

- James LaBrie – lead vocals
- John Petrucci – guitars
- Jordan Rudess – keyboards
- John Myung – bass
- Mike Mangini – drums

Production

- John Petrucci – production
- James "Jimmy T" Meslin – recording
- Richard Chycki – vocal recording, additional vocal production
- Ben Grosse – mixing
- Paul Pavao – mixing assistant
- Tom Baker – mastering
- Hugh Syme – art direction, illustration and design
- Mark Maryanovich – photography

== Charts ==
=== Weekly charts ===
Chart (2019)	Peak position
Australian Albums (ARIA)	10
Austrian Albums (Ö3 Austria)	5
Belgian Albums (Ultratop Flanders)	8
Belgian Albums (Ultratop Wallonia)	8
Czech Albums (ČNS IFPI)	9
Canadian Albums (Billboard)	12
Danish Albums (Hitlisten)	4
Dutch Albums (Album Top 100)	3
Finnish Albums (Suomen virallinen lista)	4
French Albums (SNEP)	16
German Albums (Offizielle Top 100)	1
Hungarian Albums (MAHASZ)	5
Italian Albums (FIMI)	4
Japanese Albums (Oricon)	10
Norwegian Albums (VG-lista)	3
Polish Albums (ZPAV)	10
Portuguese Albums (AFP)	4
Scottish Albums (Official Charts)	4
Slovak Albums (ČNS IFPI)	12
Spanish Albums (Promusicae)	6
Swedish Albums (Sverigetopplistan)	4
Swiss Albums (Schweizer Hitparade)	1
UK Albums (Official Charts)	12
UK Rock & Metal Albums (Official Charts)	1
US Billboard 200	24

=== Year-end charts ===
Chart (2019)	Position
Swiss Albums (Schweizer Hitparade)	99
