= On the Backs of Angels =

Single by Dream Theater

from the album A Dramatic Turn of Events
- Released: June 29, 2011
- Recorded: 2011
- Genre: Progressive metal
- Length: 8:43
- Label: Roadrunner
- Songwriters: John Petrucci; John Myung; Jordan Rudess
- Producer: John Petrucci

Dream Theater singles chronology
"Raw Dog" (2010)	"On the Backs of Angels" (2011)	"Build Me up, Break Me Down" (2011)

"On the Backs of Angels" is a song by American progressive metal band Dream Theater, featured on their 11th studio album A Dramatic Turn of Events. The song was written by the band's guitarist and producer John Petrucci, bassist John Myung, and keyboardist Jordan Rudess.

"On the Backs of Angels" was released as A Dramatic Turn of Events' lead single via YouTube on June 29, 2011. A music video for the song was released on September 14, 2011. The song was nominated for Best Hard Rock/Metal Performance at the 2012 Grammy Awards, eventually losing to "White Limo" by Foo Fighters.

In composing "On the Backs of Angels", on the advice from one of their fans and co-writers, Dream Theater tried to illustrate their signature sound. From the start, the band envisioned the song as an album opener that, according to Petrucci, would make their fans "feel at home". Subsequently, many fans have compared the structure of the song to that of their biggest hit, "Pull Me Under" from 1992's "Images And Words. Clocking in at 8:43 long and with numerous time signature changes, the song is mostly played in 4/4 and 3/4 time. Its introduction features a moody and foreboding arpeggiated guitar pattern that was written by Petrucci and inspired by the music of said fan favorite, Pink Floyd. At 5:51, the song breaks down into a piano passage that was improvised by Rudess.

== Music video ==
A music video was released for the song. It features shots of the band playing the song live, along with gears turning, the White House, various American cities, temples, and money. The video ends with the sun rising.

== Rock Band 3 ==
It was made available to download on November 29, 2011, for play in Rock Band 3 'Basic' and 'Pro' mode which utilizes real guitar/bass guitar, and MIDI-compatible electronic drum kits/keyboards in addition to vocals. It is one of the few songs available through the main store that is rated 'Impossible' (the highest difficulty) on 8 out of 10 instruments, and is the hardest song available for Keys and Pro Keys.
