= Metropolis Pt. 2: Scenes from a Memory =

1999 studio album by Dream Theater

Studio album by Dream Theater
- Released: October 26, 1999
- Recorded: 1999
- Studios: BearTracks Studios in Suffern, New York; Metalworks Studios in Mississauga, Ontario (vocal parts)
- Genres: Progressive metal; progressive rock
- Length: 77:06
- Label: Elektra
- Producers: John Petrucci; Mike Portnoy

Dream Theater chronology
| Once in a LIVEtime (1998) | Metropolis Pt. 2: Scenes from a Memory (1999) | Live Scenes from New York (2001) |

Singles from Metropolis Pt. 2: Scenes from a Memory
- 1. "Through Her Eyes" Released: February 2000

Metropolis Pt. 2: Scenes from a Memory is the fifth studio album and first concept album by the American progressive metal band Dream Theater, released on October 26, 1999, through Elektra Records. It was recorded at BearTracks Studios in Suffern, New York, where the band had previously recorded their second studio album, Images and Words (1992), and the EP A Change of Seasons (1995).

The album is the sequel to "Metropolis—Part I: 'The Miracle and the Sleeper'", a song featured on the band's 1992 album Images and Words. It was the first album to feature Jordan Rudess on keyboards.

For the album's twentieth anniversary, the band performed the album live in its entirety throughout the Distance over Time Tour (as documented on Distant Memories - Live in London).

On June 24, 2024, it was announced that the album would receive a novel adaptation, with Peter Orullian as the author. It was released on October 26, 2024, coinciding with the album's 25th anniversary.

== History ==
Fans had previously requested a sequel to the song "Metropolis—Part I" from Images and Words, but the band had not yet been able—nor had they originally intended—to make one. The "Part I" was added by Petrucci as a joke. During the sessions for Falling into Infinity (1997), the band recorded a 21-minute instrumental demo of "Metropolis Pt. 2" (which Mike Portnoy later released via his YtseJam Records site along with the other Falling Into Infinity demos), but this did not make it onto the album. The demo, which included several musical references to "Metropolis—Part I", featured many motifs that would later appear on Metropolis Pt. 2: Scenes from a Memory, but was significantly different from the finished album version in most parts. Motifs retained on the album include most notably the majority of "Overture 1928" and "Strange Deja Vu", and parts of "The Dance of Eternity" and "One Last Time".

At some point during the mixing sessions for their 1994 album, Awake, keyboardist Kevin Moore left Dream Theater. Accordingly, they held auditions for keyboardists. Initially, Jordan Rudess played one concert with them on September 9, 1994, but he was not yet considered a full-time member due to commitments to another band, the Dixie Dregs, and his job at Kurzweil Music Systems. Once more, they held another round of auditions for keyboardists, and in October 1994, they selected Derek Sherinian as a touring keyboardist, then promoted him to full-time member in February 1995. His time in Dream Theater yielded an EP (A Change of Seasons), one studio album (Falling into Infinity), and one live album (Once in a LIVEtime). Sherinian provided synth work for the "Metropolis Pt. 2" demo recorded during the sessions for Falling Into Infinity.

While Dream Theater had to promote that album with Sherinian, their drummer Mike Portnoy and guitarist John Petrucci had a side project named Liquid Tension Experiment, which also included bassist Tony Levin and returning session keyboardist Jordan Rudess.

Portnoy and Petrucci then convinced bassist John Myung and singer James LaBrie to have Jordan Rudess join, and Derek Sherinian was fired from Dream Theater via conference call. (Portnoy and Petrucci have stated that while it was an uncomfortable and unattractive situation, they did not want to ask Derek to fly from Los Angeles to New York only to be fired.)

After his departure, the band returned to BearTracks Studios in Suffern, New York, to record their new album, the same location where Images and Words was recorded (a photograph of BearTracks is featured on the album's back cover, meant to represent the house in the album). After the commercial failure of Falling Into Infinity, their record label gave the band free rein over the direction of their new album, which led the band to finally finish the story. The final version of the story became a concept album, dealing with the story of a man named Nicholas and his discovery of his past life, which involves love, murder, and infidelity as Victoria Page, and as such was heavily inspired by the 1991 film Dead Again, more so than "Metropolis—Part I".

Following the album's release, the band embarked on an extensive world tour, and at a show in New York City, they hired actors to perform the narrative elements of the album while they played. The performance was recorded and released in 2001 as the Metropolis 2000 live DVD. In 2011, the album was released on LP for the first time to celebrate Record Store Day. In 2019, the twentieth anniversary of the release of Metropolis Pt. 2: Scenes from a Memory, Dream Theater performed it live in its entirety alongside material from their fourteenth studio album, Distance over Time. The Distance over Time tour was documented as well and released in November 2020.

== Synopsis ==
=== Act I ===
Metropolis Pt. 2: Scenes from a Memory opens with Nicholas, a troubled man undergoing past life regression therapy. In a hypnotic trance induced by his hypnotherapist, he begins to see a girl named Victoria Page (her full name is in the CD booklet and was shown during the 2019 tour, when the album was performed in its entirety) and experiences a life that feels strangely familiar, despite never having been there. ("Regression") He learns that she was murdered and discovers that he was Victoria in a past life. ("Strange Deja Vu") Nicholas starts to believe that Victoria is haunting him to reveal the truth about her murder. ("Through My Words") He recalls that Victoria distanced herself from her lover, Julian Baynes (his last name is given in the 2019 tour video and is also in the CD insert), due to his drinking and gambling addictions. She sought comfort in Julian's brother, Edward Baynes, and began an affair with him. Nicholas assumes that Julian, out of jealousy, murdered her and then killed himself, a story supported by a newspaper article covering the events, which cites a witness's testimony. However, Nicholas begins to doubt this version of events and converses with an older man who was more familiar with the case (an animated video shown during "Fatal Tragedy" on the 2019 tour strongly suggests he is a reincarnated Julian). Nicholas realizes that he will never be able to move on with his own life until he solves her murder. ("Fatal Tragedy"; "Beyond This Life"; "Through Her Eyes")

=== Act II ===
The second act opens by describing Julian's addictions to cocaine and gambling, which drives Victoria away from him. Edward feels guilty about deceiving his brother but decides that his love for Victoria is stronger than his guilt, and he seduces her when she is vulnerable following her breakup. ("Home"; "The Dance of Eternity") After visiting Edward's old house, Nicholas believes he has solved the mystery: Julian had tried to beg Victoria for forgiveness, and when rebuffed, killed both her and Edward, then positioned himself as the witness in the newspaper article. ("One Last Time") Nicholas comes to terms with what happened and bids farewell to Victoria. The hypnotherapist ends the session at this point, despite pleas from Victoria's memories. ("The Spirit Carries On") The narrative then shifts to Edward's perspective, revealing that he wished his romance with Victoria was more than a simple affair. As Victoria begins to reconcile with Julian, Edward confronts the two of them, murders them, then stages the scene and assumes the role of the witness for the newspaper column. The flashback includes Edward telling Victoria to "open [her] eyes" before killing her, echoing the same words the hypnotherapist used to wake Nicholas from his hypnotic trance. ("Finally Free") In the present, Nicholas arrives home, followed by the hypnotherapist. Nicholas is startled by another request to "open [his] eyes" before the album cuts to (and concludes with) phonographic static. The band confirmed on the Metropolis 2000 live DVD that the hypnotherapist is Edward's reincarnation and has killed Nicholas to complete the cycle once again.

The static that closes the album continues at the beginning of "The Glass Prison", the first song on their next album, Six Degrees of Inner Turbulence (2002), and this pattern persists through their subsequent albums until Octavarium (2005), with the same concept but different closing notes.

== Influences ==
Scenes from a Memory showcased a traditional progressive rock sound. According to the "Making of Scenes from a Memory" video, some of the influences for Metropolis Pt. 2 are the following concept albums: The Who's Tommy (1969), Genesis' The Lamb Lies Down on Broadway (1974), Roger Waters' Amused to Death (1992), Radiohead's OK Computer (1997), Queensrÿche's Operation: Mindcrime (1988), The Beatles' Sgt. Pepper's Lonely Hearts Club Band (1967), Marillion's Misplaced Childhood (1985), and Pink Floyd's The Wall (1979) and The Final Cut (1983). These albums are shown on a table Mike calls "Inspiration Corner".

== Reception ==
Professional ratings
Review scores
| Source | Rating |
|---|---|
| AllMusic | 4/5 stars |
| Collector's Guide to Heavy Metal | 8/10 |
| Rock Hard | 10/10 |
| Metal Storm | 10/10 |

Metropolis Pt. 2: Scenes from a Memory reached #73 on the Billboard 200 albums chart, #2 on the Billboard Top Internet Albums, #6 on the Finnish Albums Chart, and #8 on the German Albums Chart. The album received acclaim from various sources. It was ranked number 95 in the October 2006 issue of Guitar World magazine's list of "The greatest 100 guitar albums of all time". It was also ranked as the 15th Greatest Concept Album (as of March 2003) by Classic Rock Magazine. The German Rock Hard magazine voted it Album of the Month, giving it a perfect score, and eventually ranked it number 410 in their book The 500 Greatest Rock & Metal Albums of All Time in 2005.

In 2012, the readers of Rolling Stone voted the album into the #1 position in their "Your Favorite Prog Rock Albums of All Time" poll. Scenes from a Memory was also ranked by the same magazine at #29 in their list of "50 Greatest Prog Rock Albums of All Time".

In 2015, The Prog Report ranked it #3 in the Top 50 Modern Prog Albums 1990–2015.

Jordan Blum of PopMatters called the album "the greatest progressive metal work of all time."

Loudwire named it #14 in their list of "Top 25 Progressive Metal Albums of All Time" and placed it on top of their "12 Best Prog Metal Albums of the '90s" list.

== Track listing ==
All music is composed by Dream Theater, except where noted.

Act I
| No. | Title | Lyrics | Length |
|---|---|---|---|
| 1. | "Scene One: Regression" (music: Petrucci) | John Petrucci | 2:06 |
| 2. | "Scene Two: I. Overture 1928" | (instrumental) | 3:37 |
| 3. | "Scene Two: II. Strange Deja Vu" | Mike Portnoy | 5:12 |
| 4. | "Scene Three: I. Through My Words" (music: Petrucci) | Petrucci | 1:02 |
| 5. | "Scene Three: II. Fatal Tragedy" | John Myung | 6:49 |
| 6. | "Scene Four: Beyond This Life" | Petrucci | 11:22 |
| 7. | "Scene Five: Through Her Eyes" | Petrucci | 5:29 |

Act II
| No. | Title | Lyrics | Length |
|---|---|---|---|
| 8. | "Scene Six: Home" | Portnoy | 12:53 |
| 9. | "Scene Seven: I. The Dance of Eternity" | (instrumental) | 6:13 |
| 10. | "Scene Seven: II. One Last Time" | James LaBrie | 3:46 |
| 11. | "Scene Eight: The Spirit Carries On" | Petrucci | 6:38 |
| 12. | "Scene Nine: Finally Free" | Portnoy | 11:59 |
| Total length: | | | 77:06 |

== Personnel ==
Dream Theater

- James LaBrie – lead vocals
- John Myung – bass
- John Petrucci – guitars, backing vocals, programming (track 7), production
- Mike Portnoy – drums, percussion, backing vocals, production
- Jordan Rudess – keyboards

Guests

- Theresa Thomason – additional vocals (tracks 7, 11)
- Terry Brown – spoken voice (tracks 1, 5, 12)
- David Bottrill – spoken voice (track 12)
- Gospel choir on track 11 arranged and conducted by Jordan Rudess
  - Choir: Theresa Thomason, Mary Canty, Shelia Slappy, Mary Smith, Jeanette Smith, Clarence Burke Jr., Carol Cyrus, Dale Scott

Production

- Doug Oberkircher – sound engineering
- Brian Quackenbush – assistant engineering
- Michael Bates – assistant engineering
- Terry Brown – vocals co-production
- Kevin Shirley – mixing engineering (tracks 2–8, 11)
- Rory Romano – mixing engineering assistance (tracks 2–8, 11)
- David Bottrill – mixing engineering (tracks 1, 9, 10, 12)
- Shinobu Mitsuoka – mixing engineering assistance (tracks 1, 9, 10, 12)
- George Marino – mastering engineering
- Eugene Nastasi – mastering engineering assistance
- Lili Picou – art direction and design
- Dave McKean – cover illustration
- Ken Schles – still life photography
- Andrew Lepley – house photography
- Darko Danicic – band photography

== Charts ==
| Chart (1999) | Peak position |
|---|---|
| Dutch Albums (Album Top 100) | 28 |
| Finnish Albums (Suomen virallinen lista) | 6 |
| French Albums (SNEP) | 40 |
| German Albums (Offizielle Top 100) | 8 |
| Hungarian Albums (MAHASZ) | 13 |
| Japanese Albums (Oricon) | 19 |
| Norwegian Albums (VG-lista) | 28 |
| Swedish Albums (Sverigetopplistan) | 44 |
| Swiss Albums (Schweizer Hitparade) | 44 |
| US Billboard 200 | 73 |
