= Breaking the Fourth Wall (album) =

Live album / video by Dream Theater
- Released: September 29, 2014
- Recorded: March 25, 2014
- Venue: Boston Opera House
- Genres: Progressive metal; progressive rock; symphonic metal
- Length: 165:36 (video); 158:49 (album)
- Label: Roadrunner
- Producer: John Petrucci

Dream Theater chronology
Live at Luna Park (2013)	Breaking the Fourth Wall (2014)	The Astonishing (2016)

Breaking the Fourth Wall is the eighth live album and video by American progressive metal band Dream Theater, recorded live at the Boston Opera House on March 25, 2014, and released on September 29 on CD, DVD, and Blu-ray; the DVD and Blu-ray releases include bonus features. The release was announced by the band on August 21, 2014, and a promotional video featuring the live version of "The Looking Glass" was uploaded to YouTube. Another promotional video featuring the live version of "Strange Déjà Vu" was uploaded on September 15, 2014.

The concert was filmed and directed by Pierre and François Lamoureux, known for their work on most of the concert films by Rush. It features the Berklee College of Music "World Strings" and "Concert Choir" on all songs from "Illumination Theory" onwards.

Breaking the Fourth Wall has been released in a number of formats:

- 2xDVD
- Digital MP3 Album
- Blu-ray
- Blu-ray + 3xCD
- Blu-ray + 3xCD + poster

Customers who pre-ordered the album received an instant download of "The Looking Glass".

== Track listing ==
=== DVD/Blu-ray ===
The Blu-ray release features all songs on one disc, while the DVD release consists of two discs.

DVD Version

Disc 1

1. "The Enemy Inside"
2. "The Shattered Fortress"
3. "On the Backs of Angels"
4. "The Looking Glass"
5. "Trial of Tears"
6. "Enigma Machine" (with drum solo by Mike Mangini)
7. "Along for the Ride"
8. "Breaking All Illusions"

Disc 2

9. "The Mirror"
10. "Lie"
11. "Lifting Shadows Off a Dream"
12. "Scarred"
13. "Space-Dye Vest"
14. "Illumination Theory"
15. "Overture 1928"
16. "Strange Déjà Vu"
17. "The Dance of Eternity"
18. "Finally Free"

Blu-Ray Version

Single Disc

1. "The Enemy Inside"
2. "The Shattered Fortress"
3. "On the Backs of Angels"
4. "The Looking Glass"
5. "Trial of Tears"
6. "Enigma Machine" (with drum solo by Mike Mangini)
7. "Along for the Ride"
8. "Breaking All Illusions"
9. "The Mirror"
10. "Lie"
11. "Lifting Shadows Off a Dream"
12. "Scarred"
13. "Space-Dye Vest"
14. "Illumination Theory"
15. "Overture 1928"
16. "Strange Déjà Vu"
17. "The Dance of Eternity"
18. "Finally Free"

=== CD ===
Disc one
No.	Title	Lyrics	Music	Original Album	Length
1.	"The Enemy Inside"	Petrucci	Dream Theater	Dream Theater	6:18
2.	"The Shattered Fortress"	Portnoy	Petrucci, Portnoy, Myung, Rudess	Black Clouds & Silver Linings	12:45
3.	"On the Backs of Angels"	Petrucci	Petrucci, Myung, Rudess	A Dramatic Turn of Events	8:48
4.	"The Looking Glass"	Petrucci	Dream Theater	Dream Theater	4:46
5.	"Trial of Tears"	Myung	Dream Theater	Falling into Infinity	15:23
6.	"Enigma Machine"	instrumental	Petrucci, Myung, Rudess, Mangini	Dream Theater	8:21
7.	"Along for the Ride"	Petrucci	Petrucci, Rudess	Dream Theater	4:53
8.	"Breaking All Illusions"	Petrucci, Myung	Petrucci, Myung, Rudess	A Dramatic Turn of Events	12:29
Total length:					73:43

Disc two
No.	Title	Lyrics	Music	Original Album	Length
9.	"The Mirror"	Portnoy	Dream Theater	Awake	6:47
10.	"Lie"	Moore	Dream Theater	Awake	7:56
11.	"Lifting Shadows Off a Dream"	Myung	Dream Theater	Awake	6:27
12.	"Scarred"	Petrucci	Dream Theater	Awake	11:41
13.	"Space-Dye Vest"	Moore	Moore	Awake	7:48
14.	"Illumination Theory"	Petrucci	Dream Theater	Dream Theater	19:25
Total length:					60:04

Disc three
No.	Title	Lyrics	Music	Original Album	Length
15.	"Scene Two: I. Overture 1928"	instrumental	Dream Theater	Metropolis Pt. 2	3:41
16.	"Scene Two: II. Strange Déjà Vu"	Portnoy	Dream Theater	Metropolis Pt. 2	5:09
17.	"Scene Seven: I. The Dance of Eternity"	instrumental	Dream Theater	Metropolis Pt. 2	6:16
18.	"Scene Nine: Finally Free"	Portnoy	Dream Theater	Metropolis Pt. 2	9:56
Total length:					25:02

== Personnel ==
Dream Theater

- James LaBrie – lead vocals
- John Petrucci – guitars, backing vocals
- Jordan Rudess – keyboards, Continuum, iPad apps, Seaboard
- John Myung – bass, Moog Taurus pedals
- Mike Mangini – drums, percussion

Guest Musicians (Tracks 14–18 & Intro Movie)

- Berklee College of Music orchestra and choir
- Eren Başbuğ – orchestral arrangements, conducting

DVD Credits

- Pierre Lamoureux – director
- François Lamoureux – director
- Denis Normandeau – recording engineer
- Albert Chambers – recording engineer
- Martin Julien – editor
- Richard Chycki – mixing, mastering
- Hugh Syme – cover art

== Charts ==
=== Album charts ===
Chart (2014)	Peak position
Hungarian Albums (MAHASZ)	9

=== Video charts ===
Chart (2014)	Peak position
Dutch DVDs (Album Top 100)	2
Finnish Albums (Suomen virallinen lista)	1
German Albums (Offizielle Top 100)	28
Swiss DVDs (Schweizer Hitparade)	1
