= Dream Theater (album) =

2013 studio album by Dream Theater

Studio album by Dream Theater
- Released: September 23, 2013
- Recorded: January–May 2013
- Studio: Cove City Sound Studios, Glen Cove, New York
- Genre: Progressive metal; progressive rock
- Length: 68:01
- Label: Roadrunner
- Producer: John Petrucci

Dream Theater chronology
A Dramatic Turn of Events (2011)	Dream Theater (2013)	Live at Luna Park (2013)

Singles from Dream Theater
- 1. "The Enemy Inside" Released: August 5, 2013; 2. "Along for the Ride" Released: September 9, 2013; 3. "The Looking Glass" Released: February 3, 2014

Dream Theater is the twelfth studio album by American progressive metal band Dream Theater, released worldwide in September 2013, through Roadrunner Records. The album was written, recorded, mixed, and mastered between January and May 2013 at Cove City Sound Studios in Long Island, New York, the same studio as the band's previous album, A Dramatic Turn of Events (2011). It is the first Dream Theater album to include drummer Mike Mangini in the songwriting process.

The band made the album Dream Theater to emphasize that they were moving forward in their career and to make it a reference point for fans. The album's songs are shorter on average than most Dream Theater songs, with the exception of the 22-minute closer, "Illumination Theory". Some songs utilize organic strings, which were arranged by Eren Başbuğ, a Berklee College of Music student. The album features two instrumentals, "False Awakening Suite" and "Enigma Machine", which were the first instrumentals that the band had written for a studio album since Train of Thought (2003). Many of the album's lyrics were motivated by real-life events, such as the Boston Marathon bombings.

Dream Theater moved 34,000 units in the United States during its debut week, charting at number seven and becoming the band's second highest-charting album behind 2009's Black Clouds & Silver Linings. For its lead single, "The Enemy Inside", the band received their second consecutive Grammy nomination in the Best Hard Rock/Metal Performance category. In early 2014, Dream Theater toured Europe and America in support of the album, and recorded their performance at the Boston Opera House for a live release.

== Background ==
Preliminary writing for Dream Theater's twelfth album commenced on the A Dramatic Turn of Events Tour in April 2012. During soundchecks, the band would jam and record their ideas, and guitarist John Petrucci would try out independently composed material. They did not enter the recording studio until January 2013, returning to Cove City Sound Studios in Glen Cove, New York, where they recorded their previous album, A Dramatic Turn of Events (2011). The first song that the band wrote was "Surrender to Reason", which bassist John Myung credited with setting the pace for the remainder of writing.

From the start of the creative process, drummer Mike Mangini contributed as a writer, unlike for A Dramatic Turn of Events, where Petrucci programmed the main drum parts during writing and Mangini recorded his own interpretations of them later. Commenting on Mangini's work, Petrucci said, "When people hear the drumming on this album, they’re gonna be pretty freaked out ... I feel like now he’s just Mike Mangini unleashed. It's all him. It's all his creativity, all his decisions and ideas - and man, the guy's an animal."

During the studio sessions, every band member's instrument was miked and captured as they were writing so that they could simulate ahead of time exactly how the music would sound when it was formally recorded. Reflecting on his guitar tone, Petrucci joked, "I describe it as a piece of chocolate cake and that was my goal in the studio. It's like I had a nice picture of a layered chocolate cake. Why chocolate cake? Well, chocolate cake is rich, creamy and it has layers." Recording concluded in May, and mixing was performed by Richard Chycki, who was hired based on Dream Theater's past experiences with him and his history with Rush.

== Composition ==
In calling the album Dream Theater, the band tried to define who they were and emphasize that they were moving forward. Reflecting on the decision for Guitar World, Petrucci said, "We wanted to make this album a reference point for [fans] as far as what Dream Theater is all about. That was the goal and the mission, and it set the tone for the entire project." In an article for Grantland, Steven Hyden noted the album's stylistic similarities to Rush, writing, "There are songs on Dream Theater that are just straight-up Rush imitations, most notably 'The Looking Glass,' which crossbreeds 'Limelight' with 'Freewill' while leaving out Neil Peart's misanthropic individualism."

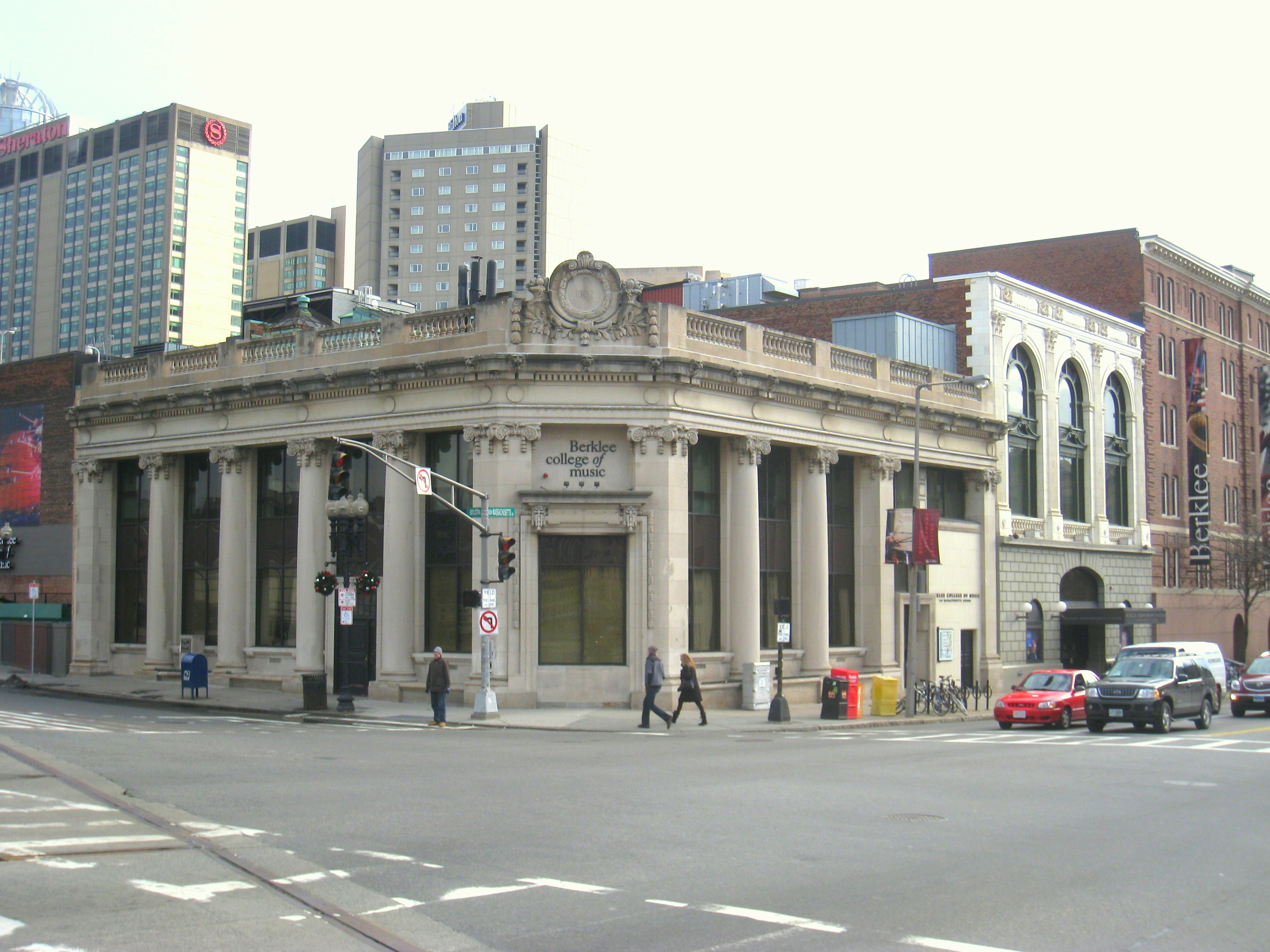
The Berklee College of Music (pictured in 2010). The band and the self-titled album have many connections to the school.

The songs on Dream Theater are shorter and more compact on average than on other Dream Theater albums, a conscious decision made by the band during writing that Petrucci later admitted was a challenge for them. Two songs on the album made use of a string ensemble conducted by Berklee College of Music student Eren Başbuğ, including the 20-minute closer "Illumination Theory", which keyboardist Jordan Rudess called the band's opportunity to go "crazy" after writing so many concise songs. Split into five sections, the track goes through many style and time signature changes, with Loudwire observing, "Jam-packed with a head-spinning mix of quiet interludes, face melting jams and, courtesy of bassist Myung and Mangini, forests full of rhythmic majesty, this suite plays like a mini album in itself."

Dream Theater features two instrumentals, "False Awakening Suite" and "Enigma Machine", the former of which was written specifically to open the band's live shows. They were the first instrumentals that the band had written for a studio album since "Stream of Consciousness" on 2003's Train of Thought. Many of the album's lyrics are based on real events; for example, "The Enemy Inside", which deals with post-traumatic stress disorder (PTSD), was written in response to the Boston Marathon bombings, and "Behind the Veil" references the Elizabeth Smart kidnapping.

== Release ==
In June 2013, Dream Theater announced that their upcoming studio album would be self-titled and released in September. The album's first single, "The Enemy Inside", was made available for streaming by USA Today on August 5, and its second single, "Along for the Ride", was made available for streaming the following month. The album was premiered by Rolling Stone on September 16 via a free online stream, and was officially released one week later, on September 23. In its debut week, Dream Theater sold over 34,000 copies in the United States to land at number seven on the Billboard 200 chart, making it the band's third-consecutive top ten debut and second-highest-charting album ever behind 2009's Black Clouds & Silver Linings, which debuted at number six. During the album's release week, the band released a music video for "The Enemy Inside", which drove awareness for Save a Warrior, a foundation dedicated to helping veterans heal from the effects of combat. Dream Theater remained on the charts until November 9, and as of January 2016, it has sold 87,000 copies total in the United States. In February 2014, the album's second and final music video was released, this time for "The Looking Glass".

== Critical reception ==
Professional ratings
Review scores
Source	Rating
AllMusic	4/5 stars
Grantland	Positive
Loudwire	4.5/5 stars
PopMatters	3/10
Revolver	3.5/5
RTÉ.ie	4/5 stars
Sputnikmusic	3.5/5

Dream Theater received generally positive reviews from music publications. AllMusic felt that it was one of the band's best albums, concluding, "it holds inside it everything a fan could want, yet also expands the reach of American prog metal." Many critics were particularly complimentary of "Illumination Theory", which Revolver described as "stunningly ambitious". Grantland's Steven Hyden, whose introduction to the band was through the self-titled album, wrote, "I drank this cocktail, and I’m glad. Dream Theater is a blast." For "The Enemy Inside", Dream Theater received their second consecutive Grammy nomination in the Best Hard Rock/Metal Performance category.

Critics reacted favorably to Dream Theater's attempt at writing more concise songs. In their review, Loudwire commented, "The band also seems to be expanding their appeal beyond the faithful with some punchy, stylish and tuneful songs that seduce immediately. Good thing, too. Because the more people that can hear an album like this, the more faithful there will be." RTÉ.ie had a similar reaction, writing, "Sure, the did-they-really-just-play-that? double takes arrive by the half-minute on their latest magnum opus (self-titled for extra definitiveness), but chances are you will come away from Dream Theater singing a chorus rather than throwing air guitar/bass/drums/keyboards/violin/conductor's baton shapes."

Some critics noted that the album was too similar to previous Dream Theater albums. PopMatters felt that the band was no longer offering anything new, observing, "For quite awhile, the sky was the limit for Dream Theater; now that they’ve ascended, however, the creative air is running thin." Sputnikmusic also wrote that the album sounded familiar, but ultimately gave it an overall positive review, saying that it did "a bit better than recent efforts in the band's formulaic approach to anti-formulaic music."

=== Supporting tour ===
In promotion of the album, Dream Theater toured Europe and North America in early 2014. The tour's setlist featured both old and new material, including nine songs off of Awake (1994) and Metropolis Pt. 2: Scenes from a Memory (1999), which were celebrating anniversaries. On March 25, the band performed at the Boston Opera House with the Berklee Concert Choir and Berklee World Strings in an event that was dubbed their "homecoming". The concert was recorded and eventually released on September 30 as part of the Breaking the Fourth Wall live collection. It debuted at number one on various music video charts, and the band donated part of the proceeds to the Dream Theater Scholarship Fund at Berklee.

== Track listing ==
All titles and song lengths taken from the Dream Theater liner notes.

All lyrics are written by John Petrucci, except where noted; all music is composed by Petrucci, Jordan Rudess, John Myung, James LaBrie, Mike Mangini, except where noted.

No.	Title	Music	Length
1.	"False Awakening Suite" (instrumental): "I. Sleep Paralysis"; "II. Night Terrors"; "III. Lucid Dream"	Petrucci, Rudess	2:42
2.	"The Enemy Inside"		6:17
3.	"The Looking Glass"		4:53
4.	"Enigma Machine" (instrumental)	Petrucci, Rudess, Myung, Mangini	6:01
5.	"The Bigger Picture"		7:40
6.	"Behind the Veil"		6:52
7.	"Surrender to Reason" (lyrics: Myung)		6:34
8.	"Along for the Ride"	Petrucci, Rudess	4:45
9.	"Illumination Theory": "I. Paradoxe de la lumière noire" (instrumental); "II. Live, Die, Kill"; "III. The Embracing Circle" (instrumental); "IV. The Pursuit of Truth"; "V. Surrender, Trust & Passion"		22:17
Total length:			68:01

Japanese edition bonus track
No.	Title	Length
10.	"The Enemy Inside" (instrumental)	6:17

== Personnel ==
All credits taken from the Dream Theater liner notes.

Dream Theater

- James LaBrie – lead vocals
- John Petrucci – guitar, backing vocals, producer
- Jordan Rudess – keyboards, GeoSynth iPad app, Seaboard
- John Myung – bass, Moog Taurus pedals
- Mike Mangini – drums, percussion

String Ensemble

- Misha Gutenberg – violin
- Larisa Vollis – violin
- Yelena Khaimova – violin
- Yevgeniy Mansurov – violin
- Aleksandr Anisimov – viola
- Noah Wallace – viola
- Anastasia Golenisheva – cello
- Valeriya Sholokhova – cello
- Len Sluetsky – double bass

Production

- Richard Chycki – engineering, mixing
- James "Jimmy T" Meslin – assistive engineering
- Kevin Matela – assistive mixing
- Dave Rowland – assistive mixing
- Eren Başbuğ – orchestral arrangement, conducting
- Ted Jensen – mastering
- Hugh Syme – cover and album design
- Larry DiMuzio – photography

== Charts ==
Chart (2013)	Peak position
Argentinian Albums Chart (CAPIF)	3
Australian Albums Chart (ARIA)	15
Austrian Albums (Ö3 Austria)	7
Belgian Albums (Ultratop Flanders)	16
Belgian Albums (Ultratop Wallonia)	19
Canadian Albums Chart (Billboard)	5
Czech Albums Chart (ČNS IFPI)	4
Danish Albums Chart (Hitlisten)	6
Dutch Albums Chart (MegaCharts)	4
Finnish Albums Chart (Suomen virallinen lista)	2
French Albums (SNEP)	18
German Albums Chart (Offizielle Top 100)	4
Hungarian Albums (MAHASZ)	2
Irish Albums (IRMA)	38
Italian Albums (FIMI)	2
Japanese Albums Chart (Oricon)	10
New Zealand Albums (RMNZ)	27
Norwegian Albums Chart (VG-lista)	7
Portuguese Albums (AFP)	10
Scottish Albums (OCC)	12
Slovak Albums (ČNS IFPI)	56
Spanish Albums (Promusicae)	11
Swedish Albums Chart (Sverigetopplistan)	5
Swiss Albums (Schweizer Hitparade)	5
UK Albums Chart (OCC)	15
UK Rock Chart	1
US Billboard 200	7
US Billboard Tastemaker Albums	3
US Billboard Top Digital Albums	10
US Billboard Top Hard Rock Albums	1
US Billboard Top Rock Albums	3
