= The Enemy Inside (Dream Theater song) =

Single by Dream Theater

from the album Dream Theater
- Released: August 5, 2013
- Length: 6:17
- Label: Roadrunner Records
- Songwriters: James LaBrie; Mike Mangini; John Myung; John Petrucci; Jordan Rudess
- Producer: John Petrucci

Dream Theater singles chronology
"Build Me Up, Break Me Down" (2011)	"The Enemy Inside" (2013)	"Along for the Ride" (2013)

"The Enemy Inside" is the first single by American progressive metal band Dream Theater's eponymous twelfth studio album. It was announced on the band's official Facebook page as the first single on August 3, 2013 and was made available by USA Today for streaming on August 5. A lyric video on YouTube for the song was published on the band's YouTube channel a day later.

There is a music video for the song which shows a returning war veteran suffering from post-traumatic stress disorder. It is notable as Dream Theater's first music video to not feature any of the band members.

On December 6, 2013, it was announced that "The Enemy Inside" was nominated for the "Best Metal Performance" Grammy Award, coming in second to Black Sabbath's "God Is Dead?"

== Track listing ==
No.	Title	Length
1.	"The Enemy Inside"	6:17

== Save A Warrior ==
During filming the music video to "The Enemy Inside", Dream Theater were connected to Save A Warrior, an organization dedicated to embracing returning war veterans and offering safe, innovative evidence-based resiliency programs for soldiers suffering from post-traumatic stress disorder. The band has worked closely to the organization.

== Personnel ==
- James LaBrie - lead vocals
- John Petrucci - guitar, backing vocals, producer
- John Myung - bass
- Jordan Rudess - keyboards
- Mike Mangini - drums, percussion

== See also ==
- List of Dream Theater songs
