= The Looking Glass (song) =

Promotional single by Dream Theater

from the album Dream Theater
- Released: February 3, 2014
- Genre: Progressive rock
- Length: 4:53
- Label: Roadrunner Records
- Songwriters: James LaBrie; Mike Mangini; John Myung; John Petrucci; Jordan Rudess
- Producer: John Petrucci

"The Looking Glass" is a song by American progressive metal band Dream Theater, from their 2013 self-titled album. It was released as a single on February 3, 2014. Musically, the song is a tribute to Rush, one of Dream Theater's biggest influences.

The song was included in the setlist on Dream Theater's Along for the Ride Tour, and is featured on the live album Breaking the Fourth Wall.

== Track listing ==
All lyrics are written by John Petrucci; all music is composed by James LaBrie, Mike Mangini, John Myung, John Petrucci and Jordan Rudess.

No.	Title	Length
1.	"The Looking Glass"	4:53

== Personnel ==
- James LaBrie – lead vocals
- John Petrucci – guitars, backing vocals, producer
- Jordan Rudess – keyboards, GeoSynth iPad app, Seaboard
- John Myung – bass, Moog Taurus pedals
- Mike Mangini – drums, percussion

== Releases ==
- CD-R, Single, Promo – Roadrunner Records, US, February 3, 2014.
