= Space-Dye Vest =

Song by Dream Theater

from the album Awake
- Released: October 4, 1994
- Recorded: 1994
- Length: 7:29
- Label: EastWest
- Songwriter: Kevin Moore
- Producers: John Purdell; Duane Baron

"Space-Dye Vest" is the eleventh and final song from American progressive metal band Dream Theater's 1994 album, Awake. The song was written entirely by the keyboardist Kevin Moore, and its demo featured Moore on vocals. It is structured around a dark, brooding duet between Moore playing the piano and vocalist James LaBrie. The rest of the band kick in for a dramatic outro, fading out until Moore ends the song with the piano passage that opened the song. The song is interspersed with samples from A Room with a View, The Fifth Estate, Late Night with Conan O'Brien, The Trouble with Evan and a news commentary by Jim Hill during the O. J. Simpson freeway chase.

== History ==
The song was composed by Moore while touring for Images and Words in 1993, and surfaced as part of a series of demos composed by him and that were not suitable for Dream Theater, but for his own experiment.

Kevin Moore spoke to a Japanese interviewer regarding the meaning behind the song:

I was looking through a clothing catalog and saw a picture of a girl modeling this piece of clothing called a space-dye vest. And, so, I fell in love with her [laughs] for some strange reason and so the minute I did that, the minute I was just like obsessed with this person, I was like, "why am I doing that?" and I noticed that I was doing it a lot lately. And I think the prime reason that I was doing that, and this is what I figured out at the time, was that I had just come out of a relationship where I'd gotten dumped, basically, and so I think the situation was that I wasn't finished giving all that I was ready to give, so I was just, like, throwing it around, you know, just aiming it in different directions. It was a total case of projection. And this song is just trying to sort it out and just kind of admitting that I'm just kind of lost. So it's kind of a dark song. It was very cathartic though.

Singer James LaBrie said "Kevin Moore saw this photograph in a fashion magazine of a beautiful model wearing a space-dye vest and he fell in love with her. ... He carried that magazine around with him for ages, but he realized that the only way the innocence could be kept, so that he could retain that love for her, was if she stayed on the page. If he'd met her, all that would have been lost." Portnoy recalled that when the rest of the band first heard the song "we thought it was so very, very different we didn't think we even wanted to fuck with it."

== Aftermath and live performances ==
Moore left Dream Theater after Awake was released on October 4, 1994. Out of respect, some members of the band had expressed that they were not willing to perform it without Moore. Portnoy commented that if they had known Moore was going to leave the band, they would not have included it on the album. He considered "Space-Dye Vest" "totally 100% [Moore's] song", and for that reason the band would never play the song live without Moore. Jordan Rudess, however, in an interview stated that he would like to play it live whenever the rest of the band is ready. Rudess performed the song live during a solo concert, with LaBrie featuring as a guest vocalist.

In 2009, the band begun jamming on the song during their tour for Black Clouds & Silver Linings, though the song was never played in its entirety until 2014, when it was performed at almost every concert of their "Along for the Ride Tour", along with the other songs making up the second half of the Awake album, in honor of the album's 20th anniversary. The song was included in the live album Breaking the Fourth Wall.

== Personnel ==
- James LaBrie – lead vocals
- Kevin Moore – keyboards
- John Myung – bass guitar
- John Petrucci – guitar
- Mike Portnoy – drums, percussion
