= Illumination Theory =

- Artwork for "Illumination Theory" 12" picture disc, released exclusively for Record Store Day 2014.

Song by Dream Theater

from the album Dream Theater
- Recorded: 2013
- Length: 22:17
- Label: Roadrunner Records
- Composers: John Petrucci; John Myung; James LaBrie; Jordan Rudess; Mike Mangini
- Lyricist: John Petrucci
- Producer: John Petrucci

"Illumination Theory" is a song by American progressive metal band Dream Theater. The song was released on 23 September 2013, as the closing track of the band's 12th album Dream Theater. It features a string ensemble conducted and arranged by Eren Başbuğ. The song's lyrics, according to the guitarist John Petrucci, are about things for which people will live, die or kill. The song's length is 22:17, making it Dream Theater's fifth longest to date.

The entire song was released as a 12" picture disc exclusively for Record Store Day 2014 and limited to 2,700 copies.

== Segments ==
1. "Paradoxe de la Lumière Noire" (instrumental)
2. "Live, Die, Kill"
3. "The Embracing Circle" (instrumental)
4. "The Pursuit of Truth"
5. "Surrender, Trust & Passion"

The song properly ends at 19:17, leading to a 30-second silence followed by a hidden track consisting of an electric guitar and piano instrumental, clocking the song out at 22:17.

== Personnel ==
Dream Theater

- James LaBrie – lead vocals
- John Petrucci – guitar, backing vocals, producer
- Jordan Rudess – keyboards, Continuum, GeoSynth App
- John Myung – bass guitar
- Mike Mangini – drums, percussion

String ensemble

- Violin I – Misha Gutenberg (concert master), Larisa Vollis
- Violin II – Yelena Khaimova, Yevgeniy Mansurov
- Viola – Aleksandr Anisimov, Noah Wallace
- Cello – Anastasia Golenisheva, Valeriya Sholokhova
- Contrabass – Len Sluetsky

Production

- Eren Başbuğ – orchestral arrangements, conducting
