= Memotron =

Digital musical instrument

The Memotron is a virtual Mellotron, based on digitized samples from the original keyboard's sounds. Manufactured by Manikin Electronic, it made its first appearance at the NAMM Show in 2006.

Jordan Rudess of Dream Theater used a Memotron on the band's Chaos In Motion Tour in 2007 and 2008, and can be heard playing it on the live album Chaos in Motion 2007–2008.

Rick Wakeman uses the Memotron when playing live. For the recording of the 2009 live album The Six Wives of Henry VIII Live at Hampton Court Palace, Wakeman used two Memotrons.

Tangerine Dream use two Memotrons live (2023).
