= Listen (Jordan Rudess album) =

Studio album by Jordan Rudess
- Released: 1993
- Genre: Progressive rock
- Length: 60:20
- Label: Invincible Records

Jordan Rudess chronology
Arrival (1988)	Listen (1993)	Secrets of the Muse (1997)

Professional ratings
Review scores
Source	Rating
Allmusic	2/5 stars

Listen is an album recorded and released by Jordan Rudess in 1993.

This is Rudess' second studio album, his first being Arrival released in 1988. In 1994 Jordan was named "Best New Talent" by Keyboard Magazine. The award was given to him based upon his live performances and this album.

== Track listing ==
All pieces are composed by Jordan Rudess.

No.	Title	Length
1.	"Listen to the Voice"	3:52
2.	"Inspiration"	5:15
3.	"Beyond the Shoreline"	4:33
4.	"Fade Away"	4:32
5.	"It's a Mystery"	6:47
6.	"Feel the Magic"	6:26
7.	"Invisible Child"	5:59
8.	"Across the Sky"	7:17
9.	"Take Time"	7:47
10.	"Danielle"	5:19
11.	"Boogie Wacky Woogie"	2:31

== Personnel ==
- Jordan Rudess – keyboards, vocals
- Barbara Bock – vocals
- Jim Simmons – bass
- Chris Amelar – guitar
- Ken Mary – drums
