= The Unforgotten Path =

Studio album by Jordan Rudess
- Released: November 16, 2015
- Genre: Instrumental contemporary classical
- Length: 57:56
- Label: Roadrunner Records
- Producer: Jordan Rudess

Jordan Rudess chronology
Explorations (2014)	The Unforgotten Path (2015)	Wired for Madness (2019)

The Unforgotten Path is a studio album by Jordan Rudess. It was released on November 16, 2015.

== Composition ==
Most tracks are covers from various albums or musicals. Tracks 3, 9, 16, and 17 are original pieces.

== Track listing ==
No.	Title	Writer(s)	Origin	Length
1.	"Entangled"	Steve Hackett, Tony Banks	A Trick of the Tail	4:24
2.	"Your Song"	Elton John, Bernie Taupin	Elton John	3:34
3.	"For Japan"	Rudess	original composition	3:36
4.	"Karma Police"	Thom Yorke, Jonny Greenwood, Ed O'Brien, Colin Greenwood, Philip Selway	OK Computer	3:39
5.	"Soon"	Yes	Relayer	3:34
6.	"The Sound of Silence"	Paul Simon	Sounds of Silence	3:57
7.	"Here, There and Everywhere"	John Lennon, Paul McCartney	Revolver	2:48
8.	"Grantchester Meadows"	Roger Waters	Ummagumma	5:18
9.	"Old Man in the House"	Rudess	original composition	3:28
10.	"Scarborough Fair"	traditional	Parsley, Sage, Rosemary and Thyme	2:50
11.	"As Tears Go By"	Mick Jagger, Keith Richards	December's Children (And Everybody's)	3:14
12.	"Imagine"	Lennon, Yoko Ono	Imagine	3:49
13.	"Moonchild"	Robert Fripp, Ian McDonald, Greg Lake, Michael Giles	In the Court of the Crimson King	3:25
14.	"The First Time Ever I Saw Your Face"	Ewan MacColl	First Take	3:38
15.	"Send in the Clowns"	Stephen Sondheim	A Little Night Music	2:49
16.	"Tribute to Jobs"	Rudess	original composition	2:03
17.	"Opus 58"	Rudess	original composition	1:50
Total length:				57:56

== Personnel ==
- Jordan Rudess – grand piano
