= Eurorack =

Standard that allows for the creation and modification of modular synthesizers

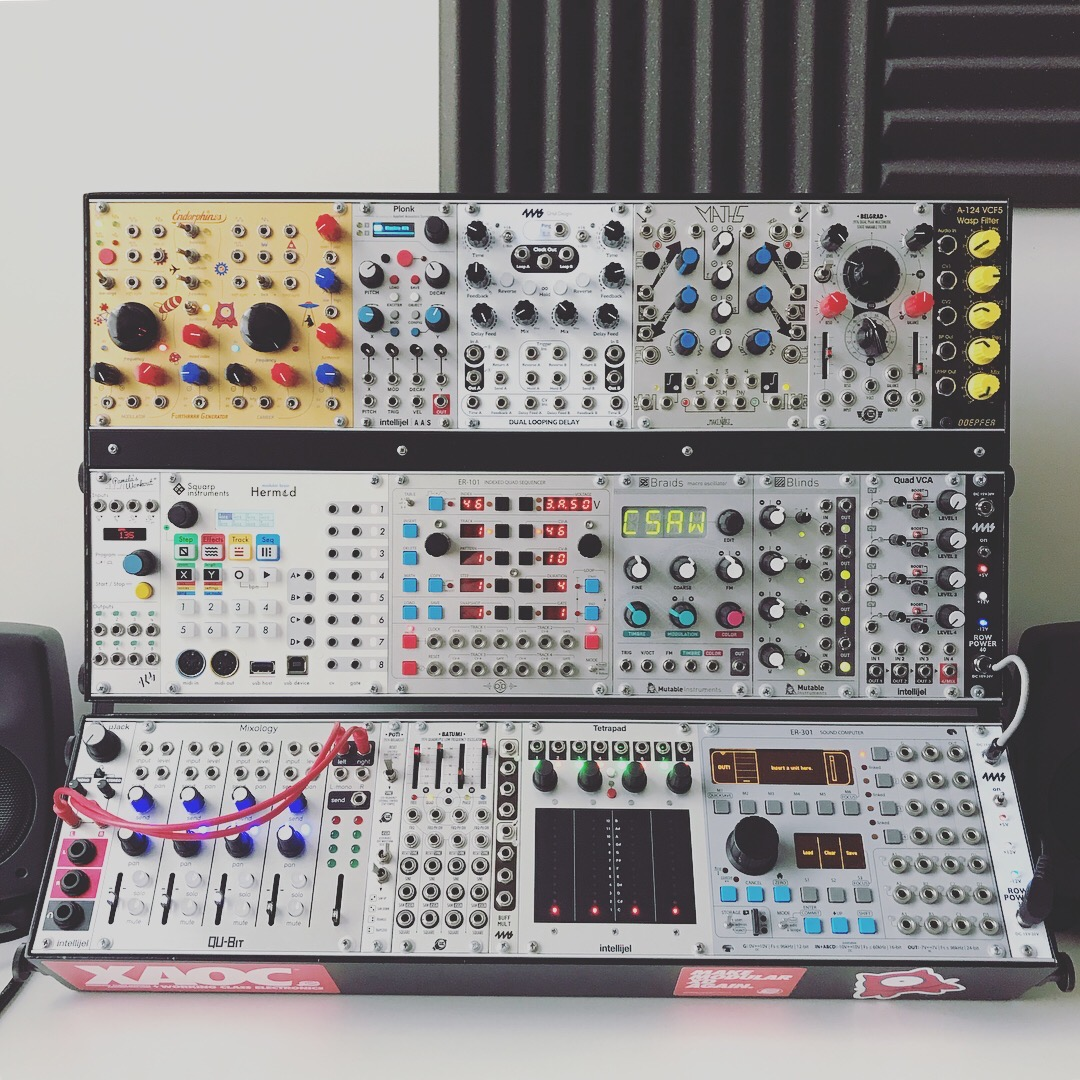
A 9U, 104hp, Eurorack modular synthesizer containing a variety of modules

Eurorack is a modular synthesizer format originally specified in 1995 by Doepfer Musikelektronik. It has since grown in popularity, and as of 2022 has become a dominant hardware modular synthesizer format, with over 15,000 modules available from more than 600 different manufacturers ranging from DIY kits and boutique, cottage-industry designers to well-known, established synth mass-manufacturers like Moog and Roland.

Compact size, 3.5 mm mono jacks and cables for patching all signals, and lack of a visual or sonic aesthetic defined by one manufacturer sets Eurorack apart from other modular synthesizer formats, and these factors have contributed to the popularity of Eurorack among both manufacturers and musicians.

== History ==
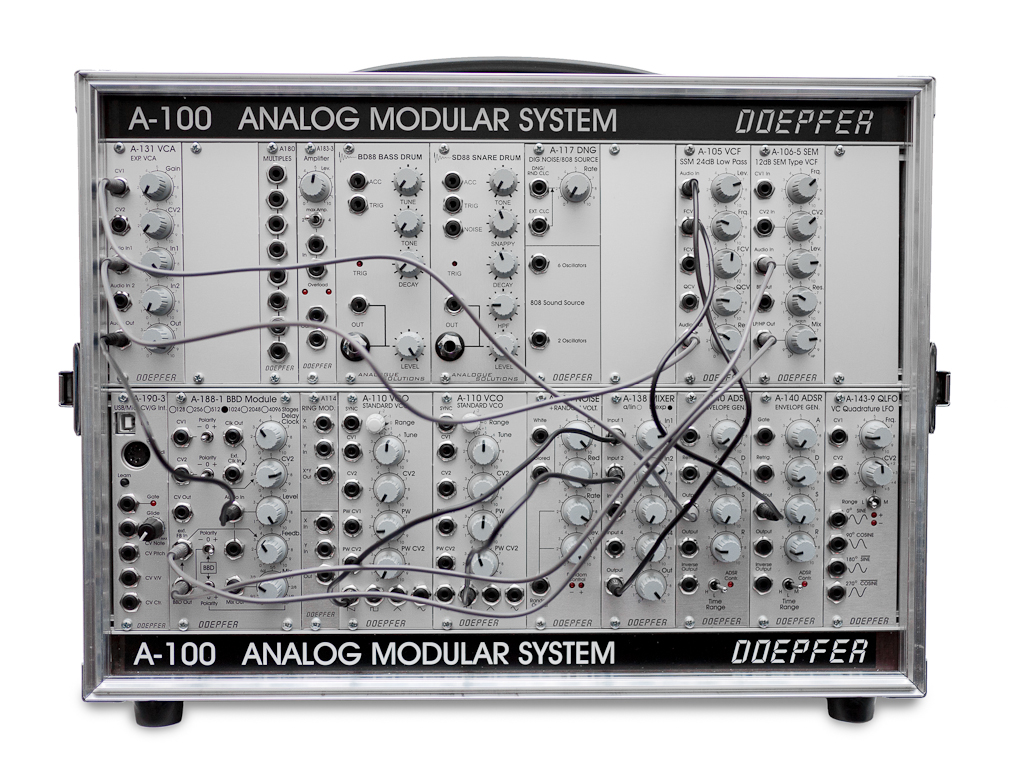
Doepfer A-100

Before Eurorack, in the late 1970s, several modular systems based on the industrial “Euro” card frames appeared:

- Elektor Formant (3U or 6U × 7HP, 3.5 mm jacks, 31-pin bus, ±15 V)
- BME PM10/Axiom (3U × 8HP, RCA/Phono jacks, 31-pin bus, ±15 V)
- The Synton 3000 (3U × 8HP, 4 mm “banana” jacks, ±15 V) was of similar format, but constructed more like a modern Eurorack synth.

By the late 1980s, these had all ceased production.

Dieter Döpfer built some Formant modules before producing his own systems. His Voice Modular System from the early 1980s was a Eurocard-based "modular" (the modules were non-patchable voice cards etc.) polyphonic synth, but the front panels look very similar to the later A100 modules.

In 1996, Doepfer Musikelektronik released the first Eurorack-format modular synthesizer system, the Doepfer A-100, followed by successive new series of compatible modules in 1997 and 1998. In the UK, Analogue Systems had been independently developing a very similar format, with small technical differences such as the power connectors. Analogue Systems would later change their products to offer Eurorack compatibility.

In the mid 2000s, other manufacturers such as Cwejman, Make Noise Music and TipTop Audio adopted Doepfer's Eurorack format and started designing and manufacturing compatible modules.

By 2013, the Eurorack format had gained in popularity. Music technology journalists estimated that there were already at least 80 manufacturers offering over 700 modules, greatly expanding the musical possibilities available from a Eurorack system to include sampling and sample manipulation, West-coast-style synthesis and wavefolding, DSP-based effects and more.

In the mid 2010s, increasing interest in Eurorack modulars prompted large, well-known music technology manufacturers to start producing Eurorack-compatible equipment aimed at this new market. In addition to modules, manufacturers like Arturia started producing outboard devices such as the Beatstep and Microbrute designed to be able to communicate with Eurorack modular synthesizers via 3.5 mm jacks transmitting control voltages. In 2015 Moog released the Mother 32, a Eurorack-compatible semi-modular synthesizer.

By the end of fall 2018, the ModularGrid website included more than 316 manufacturers.

== Specifications ==
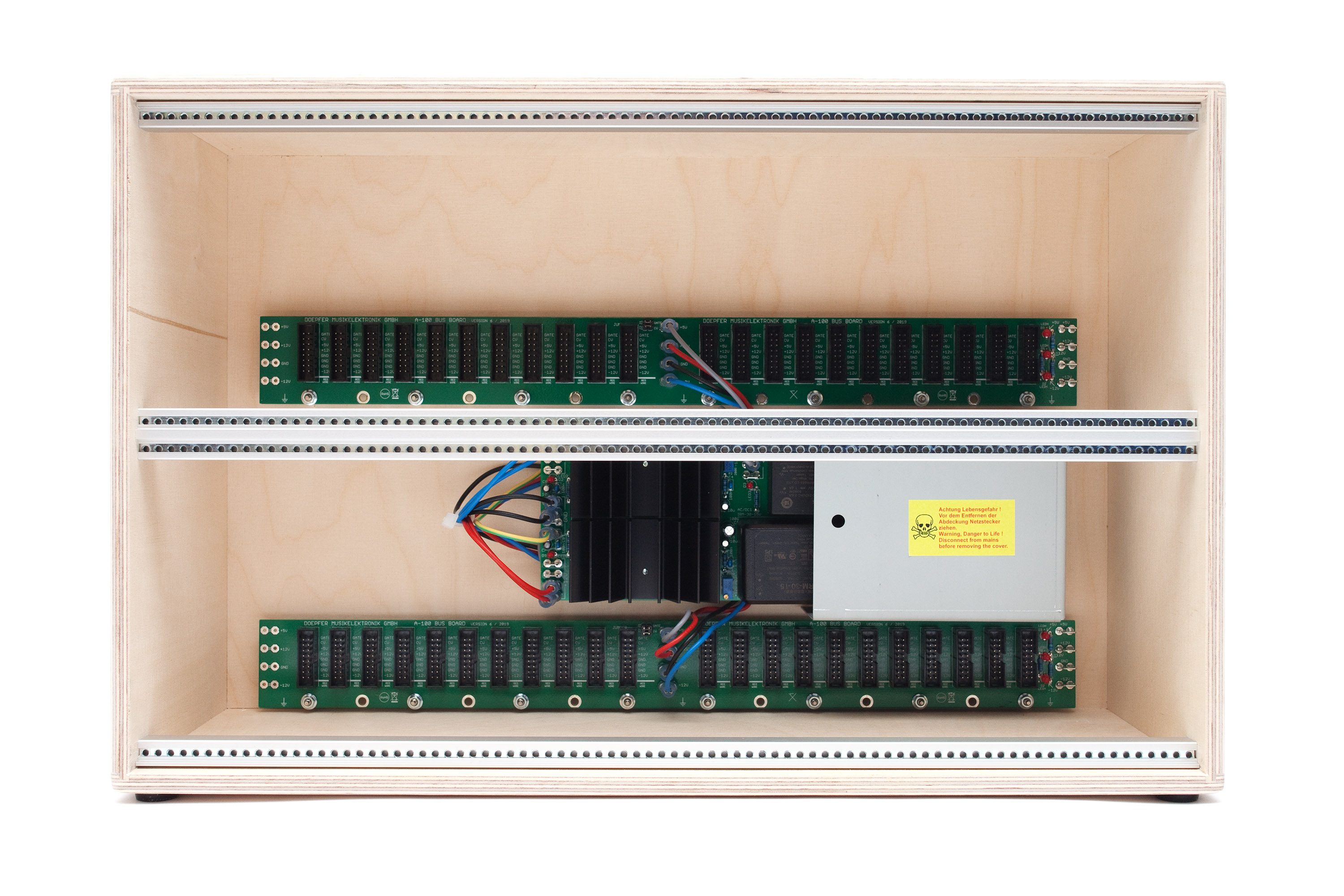
An unpopulated Eurorack case, showing the power bus

For synthesizers, Eurorack is a de facto standard to allow different modules to fit in the same cases and communicate among themselves. The basic requirement is compatibility with the Doepfer technical specifications:

- Mechanical: A100 Construction Details
- Electrical: A100 Technical Details

=== Physical ===
The physical specification is based on the Eurocard standard of:

- 3U (5.06 inches or 128.5 mm), where height "U" is measured in rack units, rounded for a lip (nb: 3U in standard rack units would be 5.25 inches or 133.3 mm).
- 1HP (0.2 inches or 5.08 mm), where width "HP" is measured in horizontal pitch units. A card width is generally integer multiples of 1HP, although some manufactures work in multiples of 0.5HP.

Eurorack modules may be further characterized by depth: shallow modules (2.5 cm to 4 cm ) can fit into "skiff" cases and are casually referred to as "skiff friendly".

=== Electrical ===
The Eurorack electrical specification defines a common bipolar 12 V DC power bus (+12V , 0 V, −12 V). This can be distributed by one of two connectors with a standard 2.54 mm (0.1 in) pitch:

- 10-pin ribbon cable, with +12 V, ground, and −12 V pins
- 16-pin ribbon cable, with Gate, CV, +5 V, +12 V, ground, and −12 V pins

Audio and control signals are exchanged between modules via 3.5 mm mono jack cables. The electrical characteristics of signals are split into three loosely defined categories:

- Audio signals are typically a maximum of 10 V peak-to-peak (i.e. between −5 V and +5 V).
- Control voltages can either be unipolar or bipolar. Bipolar control voltages are typically 5 V peak-to-peak (i.e. from −2.5 V to +2.5 V), unipolar voltages between 0 V and 8 V. The V/Octave scale is used for pitch information.
- Trigger, Gate or Clock signals are digital 0 V to 5 V pulses typically used for timing and event signalling.

=== 1U modules ===
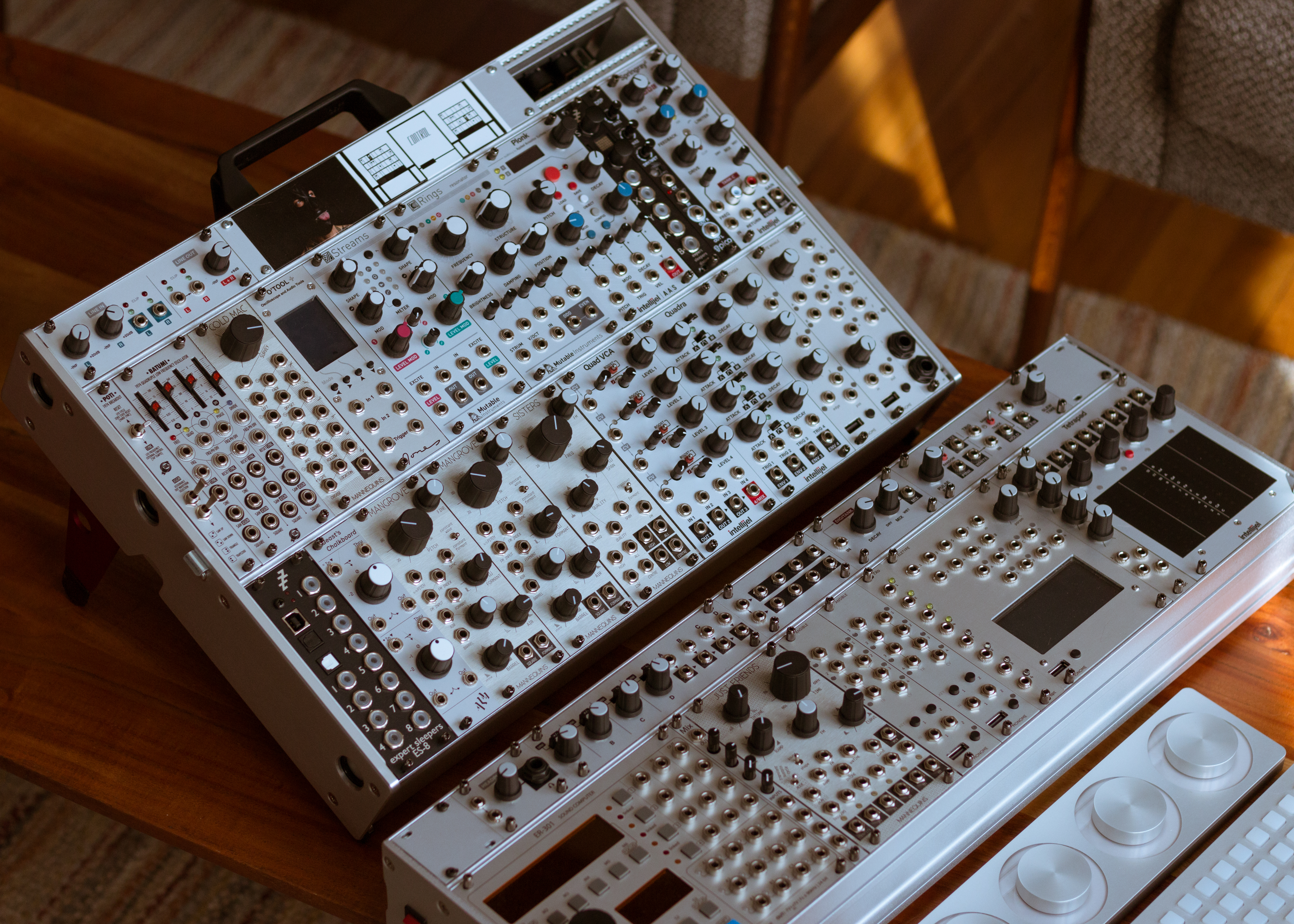
Two Eurorack cases with Intellijel-format 1U rows

Several manufacturers offer Eurorack-compatible modules in a smaller 1U tall format, sometimes referred to as "tiles". As of 2018, there are two competing standards for 1U modules, differing mainly in their height. 1U modules manufactured by Intellijel are 39.65 mm high, whereas 1U modules manufactured by Pulp Logic and other manufacturers are 43.2 mm high. Pulp Logic also proposes a more compact power connector for 1U modules, consisting of only three pins.

== Module types ==
=== Voltage-controlled oscillators (VCOs) ===
The most common source of sound in any modular synthesizer is a voltage-controlled oscillator. They depend on a control voltage, a lot of times routed from external hardware (for example, an analog synthesizer with a CV output, or MIDI signals processed on a MIDI-to-CV converter), to both control pitch, and output different waveforms.

There are various control-voltage standards for determining the voltage/pitch relationship. The most popular ones are "volts-per-octave", where 1 V equals one octave, and "hertz-per-volt", where each octave equals doubling or halving the voltage.

=== Noise source ===
Under the category of source modules, these modules are responsible for producing different “types” of noises (or colors). They can output (1) white noise — where all frequencies in the spectrum are equally powered, (2) pink noise — where there is more power to the lower end, due to its logarithmic nature, (3) brown noise — similar to pink noise, but steeper slope, (4) blue noise — oversimplified, the opposite of the pink noise, with more power concentrated on the higher frequencies, among others.

=== Modulators ===
Under the category of processors, modulators modify an incoming signal. The effects produced are widely varied and a lot of times, modules are built for a specific function, for example:

- Ring modulators multiply two signals to produce sum and difference harmonics
- Voltage controlled amplifiers multiply signals with a control waveform to vary its amplitude

=== Filters ===
Another kind of processor, filters are modules shaping the sound by attenuating specific frequency ranges. These modules contain all or a selection of the following: (1) a high-pass filter (where anything above a certain frequency can “pass” and the lower frequencies are cut out), (2) a low-pass filter (anything below a given frequency can pass and the higher frequencies are cut out), (3) a band-pass filter (where anything “in between” two frequencies can pass), and (4) a notch filter (where one cuts a specific range of frequencies out allowing everything else to pass).

=== Sequencers ===
Essentially, modules that can both operate as a source or a processor of musical content in the form of CV or MIDI messages. The most common kind are step-sequencers, where each individual musical event is triggered in a “step” of a bigger sequence (or loop).

=== Utilities ===
Utility modules are the ones responsible for expanding certain capabilities of a specific setup. They can be used to combine, split, divide, multiply, quantize, or offset a signal. One example of a utility module is a multiplier, that allow one to send any CV output to many other inputs. Another example are the attenuators responsible for scaling the CV signal with a control knob (much like faders in a mixing console).

=== Effects ===
A lot similar to the concept in a guitar pedal, effects modules are used to change the sound of an incoming signal. They can be (1) dynamic processors, used to control the level of a signal (like compressors, or limiters), (2) equalizers, used to change the frequency characteristics of a given sound (sometimes in the form of a eurorack mixer module), or (3) special effects, like delay, reverb, or chorus.

== DIY and open source ==
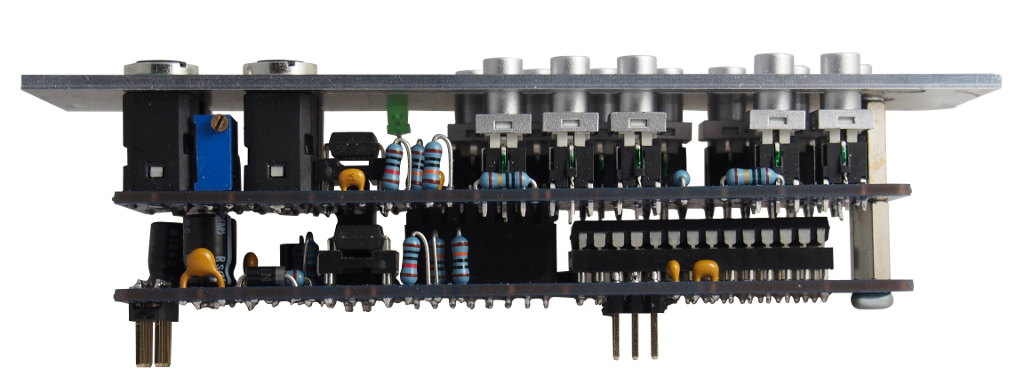
A completed Sonic Potions DIY Eurorack module kit

The technical and modular nature of Eurorack often attracts people who are interested in modifying or building their own modules or cases. Many Eurorack manufacturers started off as individuals building "do it yourself" (DIY) modules or offering DIY kits before expanding into production. Building DIY modules can be a gateway to learning more about electronics and physical manufacturing, as well as being satisfying and developing a more intimate connection with the synthesizer as a personal musical instrument.

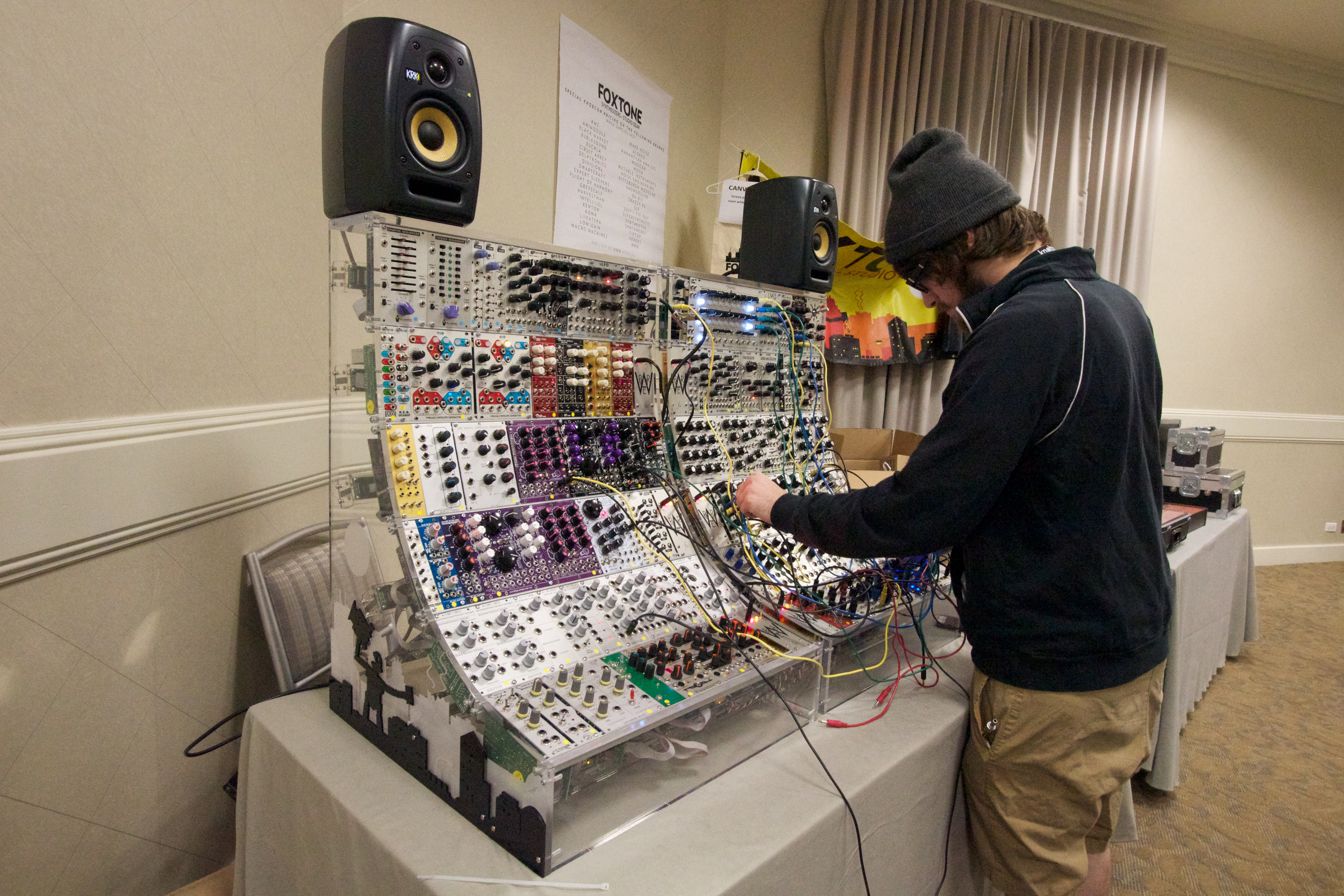

Some manufacturers such as AI Synthesis, Befaco, Bastl Instruments and Erica Synths offer some or all of their modules both as assembled products or as kits to be assembled by the buyer. Doepfer offers a case and power supply kit, as well as 'low cost' cases designed to be customised and finished by the buyer.

Releasing modules exclusively as open source designs and DIY kits allows designers such as Music Thing Modular to design and release popular modules such as the Turing Machine or Radio Music without having to run a company or invest in manufacturing. Open Source licenses for both hardware and code allow individuals to build the modules from scratch, and companies such as Thonk to offer kits.

Some manufacturers do not offer kits or intend for end users to build their products, but release the code, schematics and layout under open source licenses. Émilie Gillet of Mutable Instruments cites transparency and the possibility for customers to customise or modify their modules as driving reasons for this decision.

== Notable users ==
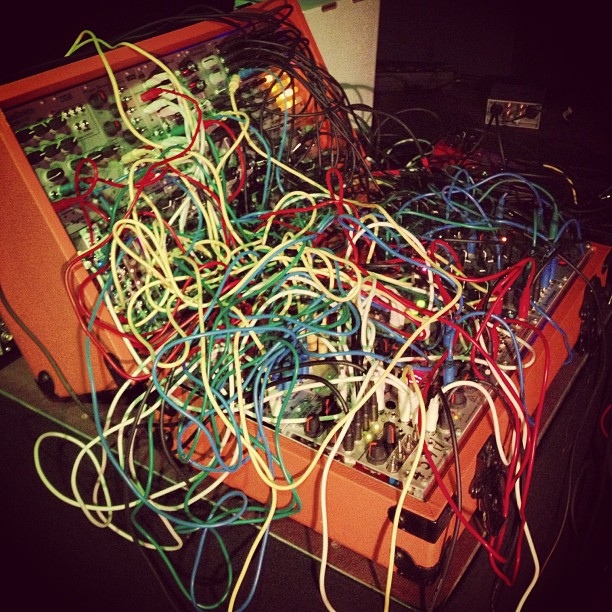
A patched Keith Fullerton Whitman Eurorack performance Eurorack case

- Alessandro Cortini
- Ana da Silva (The Raincoats)
- Andrew Huang
- Aphex Twin
- Beirut
- BT
- Caterina Barbieri
- Celldweller
- Cevin Key (Skinny Puppy)
- Coldplay
- Colin Benders (Kyteman)
- Covenant
- Daedelus
- Daft Punk
- Daniel Miller
- Danny Carey (Tool)
- Deadmau5
- Emily A. Sprague (Florist)
- Erika M. Anderson (EMA)
- Gareth Jones
- Geologist (Animal Collective)
- Jake Williams
- Jonny Greenwood (Radiohead)
- JunkieXL
- Kaitlyn Aurelia Smith
- Keith Fullerton Whitman
- King Gizzard & The Lizard Wizard
- Lady Starlight
- Luke Abbott
- Martin Gore (Depeche Mode)
- Orphx
- Gavilán Rayna Russom (LCD Soundsystem)
- Richard Devine
- Robert Aiki Aubrey Lowe
- Surgeon
- The Blow
- Trent Reznor (Nine Inch Nails)
- Venetian Snares
- Vince Clarke
- Yann Tiersen

== See also ==
- List of synthesizer manufacturers
