= Neil Zaza =

American guitarist

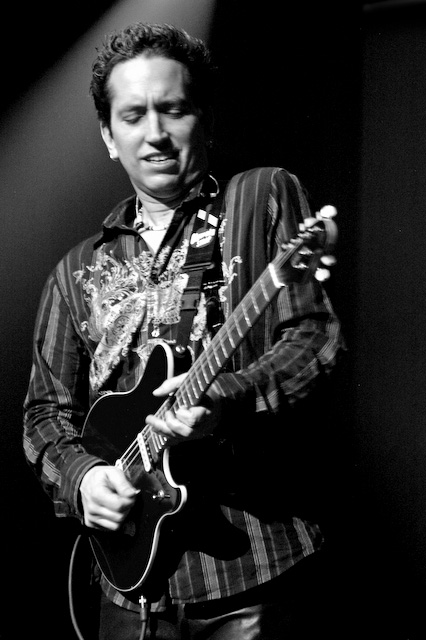
- Zaza in concert, 2009

Background information
- Born: 1964; Akron, Ohio, United States
- Genres: Heavy metal, instrumental rock, neoclassical metal
- Occupation(s): Musician, songwriter, record producer
- Instrument: Guitar
- Years active: 1987 - present
- Labels: Melodik, Neil Zaza
- Website: www.neilzaza.com

Neil Zaza is an American guitarist known for his instrumental rock compositions as well as his adaptation of classical works by Bach and Mozart into his own blend of neo-classical, melodic, guitar instrumentals.

== Biography ==
Neil Zaza, who is of Italian American heritage, was born in Akron, Ohio and began playing the guitar at the age of 10. He went on to study classical guitar at the University of Akron under Stephen Aron. Before beginning a solo career, Neil Zaza formed the rock band ZAZA in 1987. The band toured the U.S. and released an album called Party With The Big Boys in 1991. After his second solo album, Zaza was as a guest soloist with The Hartford Symphony Orchestra, performing “1492” and a guitar interpretation of “West Side Story”.

His CDs often include guest appearances by veteran musicians including:

- Jordan Rudess - keyboard player from Dream Theater appears on his When Gravity Fails CD;
- Michael Anthony - bass player from Van Halen and Chickenfoot appears on his When Gravity Fails CD;
- Steve Smith and Ross Valory - from Journey appeared on his Staring at the Sun CD.

He has also shared the stage with notable guitarists such as Joe Satriani and Michael Angelo Batio. He holds an annual concert called One Silent Night at the Palace Theater in Cleveland with the backing of the 60 piece Cleveland Rock Orchestra and features his adaptation of popular Christmas songs to his melodic style.

Zaza is known for dramatic entrances, often suddenly appearing from behind projector screens to provide his signature brand of neo-classical guitar virtuosity.

In 2006, Zaza contributed his song "Fargo" to the album project Artists for Charity - Guitarists 4 the Kids, produced by Slang Productions, to assist World Vision Canada in helping children in need.

== Discography ==
=== With ZAZA ===
- Maybe Tomorrow (7" single, 1988)
- Just Get It! (1989)
- Party With The Big Boys (1991)

=== Solo albums ===
- Two Hands One Heart (1992)
- Thrills & Chills (1993)
- Sing (1996)
- Staring at the Sun (2001)
- One Silent Night... Volume 1 (2002)
- One Silent Night... Volume 2 (2002)
- Melodica (2004)
- When Gravity Fails (2006)
- 212 (2011)
- Clyde the Cat (2012)
- Peach (2015)
- Vermeer (2022)

=== Live albums ===
- Snap, Crackle & Pop...Live! (1998)
- Neil Zaza's One Silent Night...A Night At The Palace (2007)

=== Compilation albums/appearances ===
- Distant Thunder: Sounds Of The Cleveland Metal Storm (1990) - Guitar, Songwriting on "Climbing The Alps"
- Rewind: The Definitive Collection (2005)

=== Collaborations/guest appearances ===
- Ten Zen Men Project (1997) - Guitar, Producer
- Lords of Karma: A Tribute To Vai/Satriani (2002) - Guitar
- Warmth In The Wilderness: A Tribute To Jason Becker (2002) - Guitar
- Guitar Center Volume 1 (2004) - Guitar
- Mistheria -Messenger Of The Gods (2004) - Guitars on track 2
- Guitarists 4 the Kids (2006) - Guitar
- JRZ System - Cosmic String Theory (2008) - Guitar
