= List of synthesizer manufacturers =

Notable synthesizer manufacturers past and present include:

== A ==
- Access Music
- Alesis
- ARP
- Arturia
- Akai

== B ==
- Behringer
- Buchla U.S.A.

== C ==
- Casio
- Clavia
- Crumar

== D ==
- Dave Smith Instruments
- Dewtron
- Doepfer

== E ==
- Electro-Harmonix (Micro Synthesizer)
- Electronic Dream Plant
- Electronic Music Studios (EMS)
- Elektron
- Elka
- E-mu
- Ensoniq

== F ==
- Fairlight
- Farfisa
- Fatar (Studiologic)

== G ==
- Generalmusic
- Gleeman

== K ==
- Kawai
- Korg
- Kurzweil

== M ==
- M-Audio (formerly Midiman)
- Moog Music

== N ==
- Native Instruments
- New England Digital (NED)
- Novation
- Nord

== O ==
- Oberheim

== P ==
- PAiA Electronics
- Palm Products GmbH (PPG)

== Q ==
- Quasimidi

== R ==
- Roland

== S ==
- Sequential
- Siel
- Spectrasonics
- Studio Electronics
- Synthesizers.com

== T ==
- Technics
- Teenage Engineering
- Teisco
- Therevox

== W ==
- Waldorf Music

== Y ==
- Yamaha

Modulars

- Doepfer Musikelektronik (A-100)
- Synthesizers.com
