= A Dramatic Turn of Events =

Studio album by Dream Theater
- Released: September 12, 2011
- Recorded: January–May 2011
- Studios: Cove City Sound Studios, Long Island; Mixland Studio, Midhurst, Canada
- Genres: Progressive metal; progressive rock
- Length: 77:01
- Label: Roadrunner
- Producer: John Petrucci

Dream Theater chronology
Black Clouds & Silver Linings (2009)	A Dramatic Turn of Events (2011)	Dream Theater (2013)

Singles from A Dramatic Turn of Events
- 1. "On the Backs of Angels" Released: June 29, 2011; 2. "Build Me Up, Break Me Down" Released: January 26, 2012

A Dramatic Turn of Events is the eleventh studio album by American progressive metal band Dream Theater, released worldwide in September 2011 through Roadrunner Records. It is the band's first recording to feature drummer Mike Mangini, following the initial departure of founding member Mike Portnoy in September 2010. The album was written, recorded, mixed, and mastered between January and June 2011 at Cove City Sound Studios in Long Island, New York. It was produced by guitarist John Petrucci and mixed by Andy Wallace. Two singles, "On the Backs of Angels" and "Build Me Up, Break Me Down", were released in promotion of the album.

For A Dramatic Turn of Events, Dream Theater underwent a self-proclaimed musical change, reevaluating and restructuring themselves. The album has drawn stylistic comparisons to two of the band's past albums, Images and Words (1992) and Metropolis Pt. 2: Scenes from a Memory (1999). Many songs on the album were written with a specific purpose in mind as Petrucci, one of the album's primary composers, felt a sense of responsibility to fans following Portnoy's departure. The album's title was derived from its recurring lyrical themes of dramatic changes in history that have affected people's lives, including contemporary uprisings such as the Libyan Civil War.

A commercial success, A Dramatic Turn of Events moved 36,000 units in the United States during its debut week, charting at number eight on the US Billboard 200. The album received mixed reviews from critics, but nonetheless earned Dream Theater their first-ever Grammy nomination, for "On the Backs of Angels". Between July 2011 and September 2012, the band supported the album on the A Dramatic Turn of Events Tour.

== Background ==
=== Search for a new drummer ===
On September 8, 2010, drummer Mike Portnoy announced that he would be leaving Dream Theater, citing better relationships in other projects, burnout, and his desire for a break as reasons. Elaborating on the situation for MusicRadar, guitarist John Petrucci revealed that, originally, Portnoy did not want to leave the band, and that he only wanted to take a five-year break. Only after the rest of the band rejected his proposal did Portnoy decide to officially quit.

Petrucci has called Portnoy's departure one of the hardest things Dream Theater have had to face, and speaking of when he first heard the news, keyboardist Jordan Rudess recounted, "You know, just to give you an idea of how deep this was to lose him, how difficult it was... after we got off the phone with him... I literally sat on the steps of my studio and cried. This is a guy who's a friend of mine, who we all love and admire. We didn't want to see it come crashing down."

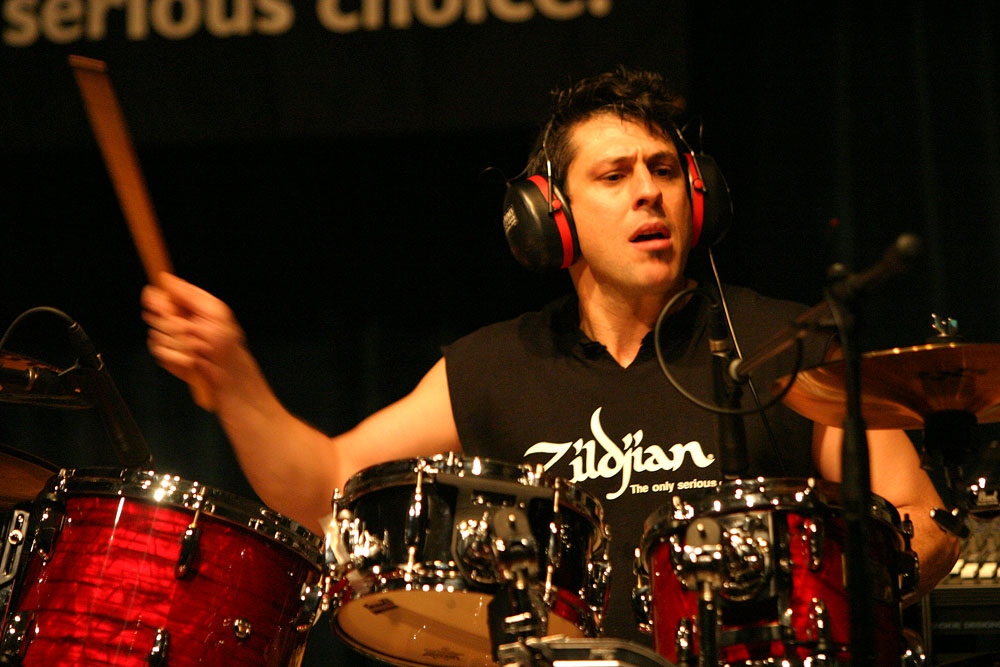
Mike Mangini (pictured in 2004) was selected as Dream Theater's new drummer following a rigorous audition process.

A little more than a month after Portnoy's departure, Dream Theater began auditioning for a new drummer in New York City. The drummers invited to audition were Mike Mangini, Derek Roddy, Thomas Lang, Virgil Donati, Marco Minnemann, Aquiles Priester, and Peter Wildoer. In April 2011, the band announced that Mangini was the drummer selected via a three-part YouTube documentary series called The Spirit Carries On.

Shortly after Mangini joined Dream Theater, Portnoy e-mailed the band asking to rejoin, but his attempt was rebuffed. Reflecting on his arrival to the band, Mangini told Noisecreep, "As I see it, as I look back, I really think what happened was that this band kind of started over. They were in a new place as they looked for a drummer, and when I got the news, after the shock wore off, I knew what I wanted to do – which was just basically come in and try to support where they wanted to go. They had a vision, they had great ideas, and I just wanted to help them achieve those things."

=== Writing and recording ===
On January 3, 2011, Dream Theater entered Cove City Sound Studios to begin working on a new album. Although John Petrucci brought in demos, riffs, and songs from home, the album was mostly written in the studio. Writing was completed on March 2 and done without Mike Mangini. The band made demos for all the songs with drums already programmed, then sent them to Mangini who learned the parts and "added his own stuff." Reflecting on the writing process for Rock Your Life, Jordan Rudess explained that the band's approach was more open to his keyboards than in the past, and that after Mike Portnoy's departure, he and Petrucci "became, like, free." Vocalist James LaBrie and bassist John Myung each contributed more to the writing than they had in recent years.

On April 14, LaBrie began tracking vocals, and by June 28, the album's mixing and mastering, which were handled by Andy Wallace, were finished. All of LaBrie's vocals were recorded in Canada with engineer Richard Chycki; originally, LaBrie planned to only record the album's first two songs away from New York City, but after flying there to finish the remainder of the vocals, decided to go back to Canada because "it just didn't feel right."

== Composition ==
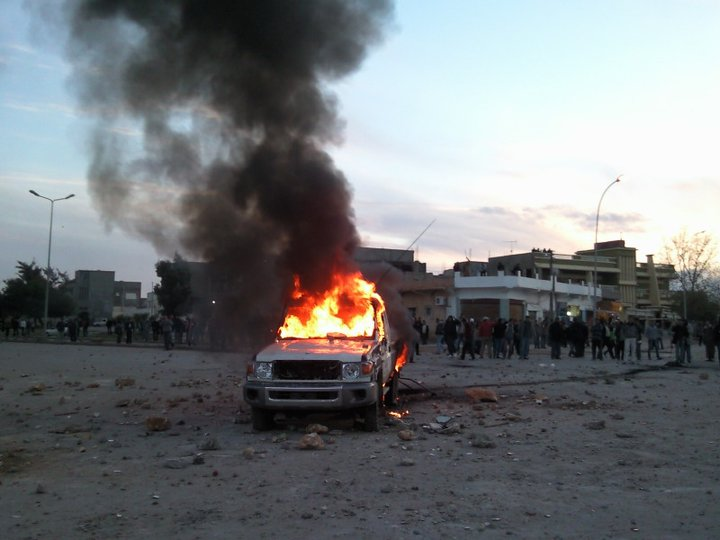
A Dramatic Turn of Events' title was inspired by contemporary uprisings, including the Libyan Civil War.

Jordan Rudess has said that for A Dramatic Turn of Events, Dream Theater underwent a musical change, re-evaluating and restructuring "who we are and what we do." Speaking in an interview for Der Spiegel and Roadrunner Germany, John Petrucci mentioned that the album "tells a story... not literally but emotionally" and likened the experience to a "roller coaster ride." In that same interview, James LaBrie emphasized that the album was melodically driven.

In his review of A Dramatic Turn of Events, Rich Wilson – author of the official Dream Theater biography Lifting Shadows – described the album's material as veering toward progressive rock and being "spiritually reminiscent" of past albums such as Images and Words (1992) and Metropolis Pt. 2: Scenes from a Memory (1999).

In composing A Dramatic Turn of Events, Petrucci admitted to feeling a sense of responsibility to fans following Portnoy's departure. He also explained that the majority of the songs on the album were written in order to prove that everything was grounded and intact with the band. Opener "On the Backs of Angels" was designed to reflect Dream Theater's signature sound, the heavy "Build Me Up, Break Me Down" was written far into the making of the album to serve as a contrast to its progressive elements, "Outcry" was intended to be the anthem of the album, and "Breaking All Illusions" was used as an epic piece that would not bind the band to conventional songwriting arrangements. The final song written for the album was the ballad "Beneath the Surface", which is also its closing track. Petrucci wrote the song himself, demoed and recorded it, and then presented it to the band, who were open to including it on the album.

Amidst speculation that A Dramatic Turn of Events' title was a vague reference to Portnoy's departure, Petrucci stressed that it is in no way a reference to anyone; rather, the title references the album's recurring themes of dramatic changes in history that have affected peoples' lives. All of the album's lyrics were written by Petrucci except for "Far from Heaven", which were written by LaBrie, and "Breaking All Illusions", which were co-written with John Myung.

== Release ==
A Dramatic Turn of Events' title, track listing, and United States release date were revealed on June 8, 2011. The album's cover art, which was designed by the band's longtime collaborator Hugh Syme, was revealed the following month. MetalSucks noted Syme's cover art used the same clip art asset as the cover for Circus Maximus's 2005 album The 1st Chapter. On June 29, "On the Backs of Angels" was released on YouTube as the album's first single. Leading up to the release of the album, Dream Theater teased various one-minute long snippets of new songs, including "Breaking All Illusions", "Beneath the Surface", and "This Is the Life". On September 14, a music video for "On the Backs of Angels" was released. On January 26, 2012, the band premiered a lyric video for their upcoming single, "Build Me Up, Break Me Down", on Loudwire.

A Dramatic Turn of Events was released worldwide on September 12, 2011 and in the United States on September 13, debuting at number one in some countries and attaining the eighth position on the US Billboard 200, Dream Theater's second top ten debut position on that chart after their previous album, 2009's Black Clouds & Silver Linings, which debuted at number six. Alongside the standard edition of the album, a special edition and deluxe collector's edition were also made available for purchase. The special edition featured different packaging and a bonus DVD containing The Spirit Carries On documentary, while the deluxe collector's edition featured, among other bonus items, instrumental versions of all songs.

== Critical reception ==
Professional ratings
Aggregate scores
Source	Rating
Metacritic	55/100
Review scores
Source	Rating
AllMusic	3.0/5 stars
The Gazette	4/5 stars
PopMatters	5/10
Sputnikmusic	3.5/5

Upon release, A Dramatic Turn of Events received mixed reviews from music publications. At Metacritic, which assigns a normalized rating out of 100 to reviews from mainstream publications, the album holds an average score of 55, based on six reviews. Rich Wilson called it "fresh and frankly stunning"; however, he warned that the album was not immediately gratifying and that it required several listens to fully appreciate. Critics were generally complimentary of Mike Mangini's performance, with Drumhead elaborating, "[he] demonstrates the physical prowess and agility of a racehorse, stretching to play at the top of his talents and reining himself in to allow his bandmates to do the same."

In a negative review for PopMatters, Chris Conaton expressed disappointment in the album's predictability, noting, "At this point it’s pretty clear that the band is comfortably ensconced in their lifestyle and content to just keep doing things the way they have been for years." In a lukewarm review for AllMusic, Thom Jurek observed, "there is something here for virtually every fan -- or detractor -- to grab hold of." Sputnikmusic criticized Mangini's drum parts, describing them as "bland", as well as the decision to include three ballads, but ultimately gave the album an overall positive review.

In their year-end wrap up for 2011, Burrn! awarded A Dramatic Turn of Events for Best Album and Best Front Cover, while John Petrucci and Jordan Rudess won Best Guitarist and Best Keyboardist, respectively. At the 2012 Grammy Awards, "On the Backs of Angels" was nominated for Best Hard Rock/Metal Performance, representing Dream Theater's first-ever Grammy nomination.

=== Supporting tour ===
The A Dramatic Turn of Events Tour kicked off on July 4, 2011, in Rome, Italy. The second leg of the tour took place in North America, where Dream Theater headlined with Trivium. After a short break to conclude 2011, Dream Theater returned to Europe in 2012 with Periphery, then to North America with Crimson Projekct before heading to South America for the final leg of the tour. On August 19 and 20, Dream Theater filmed and recorded two shows at Luna Park in Buenos Aires, Argentina. The performances were released as part of a live album, entitled Live at Luna Park, on November 5, 2013.

== Track listing ==
All lyrics are written by John Petrucci, except where noted.

No.	Title	Music	Length
1.	"On the Backs of Angels"	Petrucci, Jordan Rudess, John Myung	8:42
2.	"Build Me Up, Break Me Down"	Petrucci, Rudess, Myung, James LaBrie	6:59
3.	"Lost Not Forgotten"	Petrucci, Rudess, Myung, LaBrie	10:11
4.	"This Is the Life"	Petrucci, Rudess	6:57
5.	"Bridges in the Sky"	Petrucci, Rudess, Myung	11:01
6.	"Outcry"	Petrucci, Rudess, Myung	11:24
7.	"Far from Heaven" (lyrics: LaBrie)	Petrucci, Rudess, LaBrie	3:56
8.	"Breaking All Illusions" (lyrics: Myung, Petrucci)	Petrucci, Rudess, Myung	12:25
9.	"Beneath the Surface"	Petrucci	5:26
Total length:			77:01

== Personnel ==
All credits taken from the A Dramatic Turn of Events liner notes.

Dream Theater

- James LaBrie – lead vocals
- John Petrucci – guitar, backing vocals
- John Myung – bass, Moog Taurus pedals
- Jordan Rudess – keyboard, continuum, Morphwiz iPad app
- Mike Mangini – drums, percussion

Production

- John Petrucci – producer
- Paul Northfield – engineering, spoken words in "Breaking All Illusions"
- Joe Maniscalco – engineering assistance
- Richard Chycki – vocal track engineering
- Andy Wallace – mixing
- Paul Suarez – Pro Tools technician
- Hugh Syme – cover art
- Ted Jensen – mastering

== Charts ==
Chart (2011)	Peak position
Australian Albums (ARIA Charts)	17
Austrian Albums (Ö3 Austria)	5
Belgian Albums (Ultratop Flanders)	22
Belgian Albums (Ultratop Wallonia)	15
Canadian Albums (Billboard)	9
Czech Albums (ČNS IFPI)	5
Danish Albums (Hitlisten)	13
Dutch Albums (Album Top 100)	2
Finnish Albums Chart (Suomen virallinen lista)	1
French Albums (SNEP)	16
German Albums (Offizielle Top 100)	3
Hungarian Albums (MAHASZ)	6
Irish Albums (IRMA)	36
Italian Albums (FIMI)	3
Japanese Albums Chart (Oricon)	8
Mexican Albums (Top 100 Mexico)	22
New Zealand Albums (RMNZ)	17
Norwegian Albums (VG-lista)	5
Polish Albums (ZPAV)	7
Portuguese Albums (AFP)	9
Scottish Albums (Official Charts)	16
Spanish Albums (Promusicae)	10
Swedish Albums (Sverigetopplistan)	3
Swiss Albums (Schweizer Hitparade)	6
UK Albums (OCC)	17
UK Rock (OCC)	1
US Billboard 200	8
US Tastemaker Albums (Billboard)	1
