= Synthesizers.com =

American analog synthesizer manufacturer

- Company type: Proprietorship
- Founded: 1996
- Headquarters: Tyler, Texas
- Key people: Roger Arrick, founder
- Products: Modular synthesizers, signal processing
- Website: Synthesizers.com

Synthesizers.com is an American company based in Boston, Massachusetts, which manufactures analog modular synthesizers for music and sound-effect creation.

Originally founded by engineer Roger Arrick (also a designer of robots) in 1997, Synthesizers.com began accepting orders for modular synthesizers in 2000. In 2018 Arrick sold the business to long-time employee James Allen. In September 2023 the company was sold to new owners, who moved operations to Stafford, Texas. In May 2025 that group sold the Synthesizers.com brand in its entirety, including inventory and branding rights, to Lysandra LLC, a group of modular hobbyists-turned-retailers whose other properties include synthCube.com, Music From Outer Space, small bear electronics, and Blacet Research.

== Products ==
Synthesizers.com modular synthesizer products use analog circuitry as did the classic synthesizers produced by Moog, ARP, etc. Systems are constructed using function modules to provide customization and flexibility. Modules include the basic VCO, VCF, VCA synthesizer functions along with more advanced modules such as sequencers, ring modulators and quantizers. Cabinets of various construction styles are offered to house modules and power components.

Synthesizers.com cabinets and modules conform to the physical Moog Modular (5U tall) form factor.

== Moog 960 Sequencer reissue ==
In 2005, Synthesizers.com began offering a clone of Moog's 960 sequencer. The front panel duplicates the original 960 layout while the electronics required a redesign using currently available circuit components. Recreation of Moog's 961 and 962 accessory modules are offered as well.

== Gallery ==
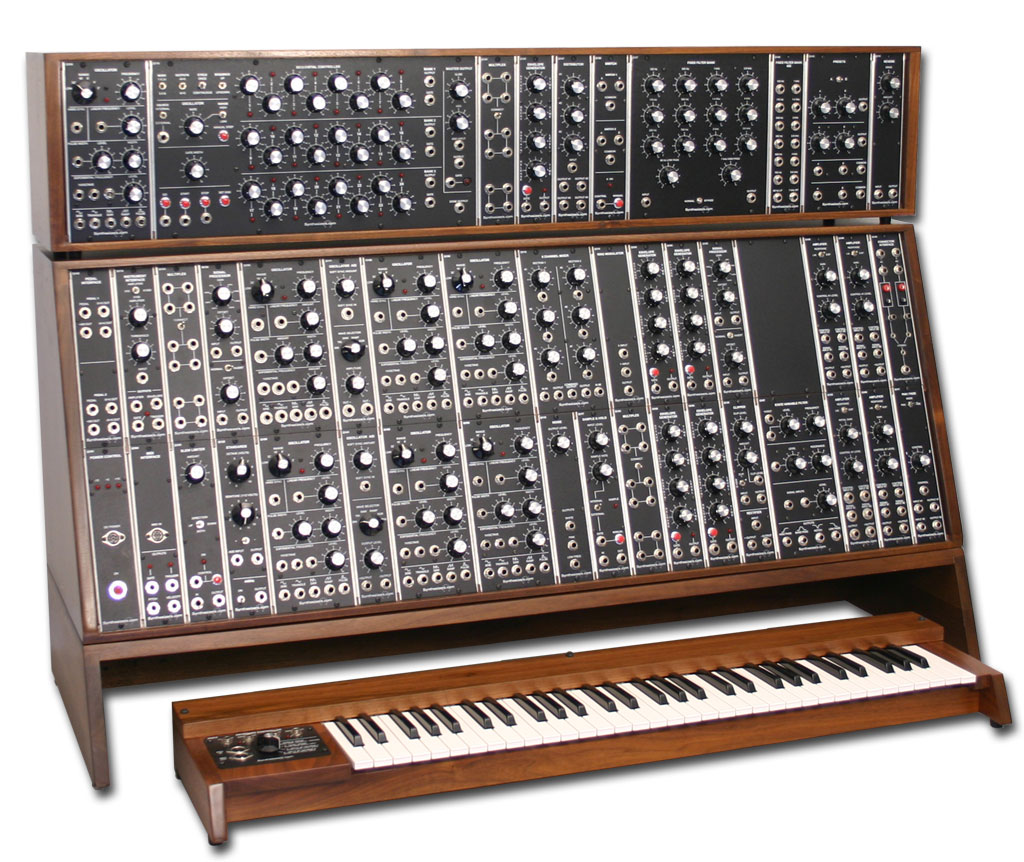
Studio-66 synthesizer system

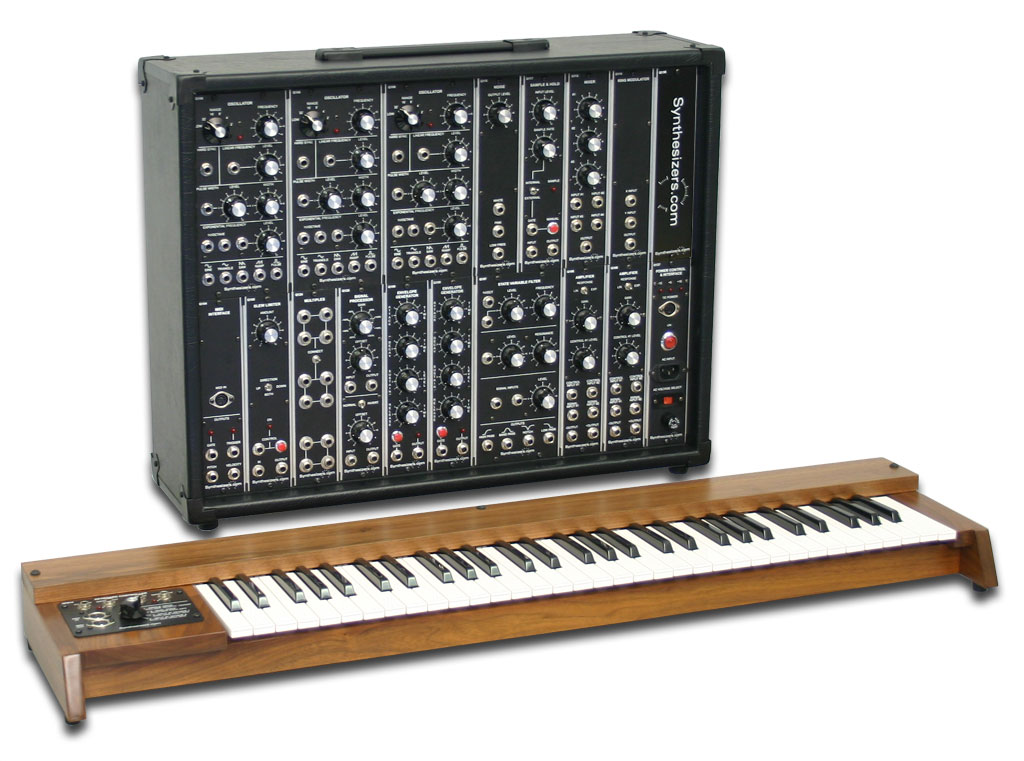
Portable-22 Synthesizer System

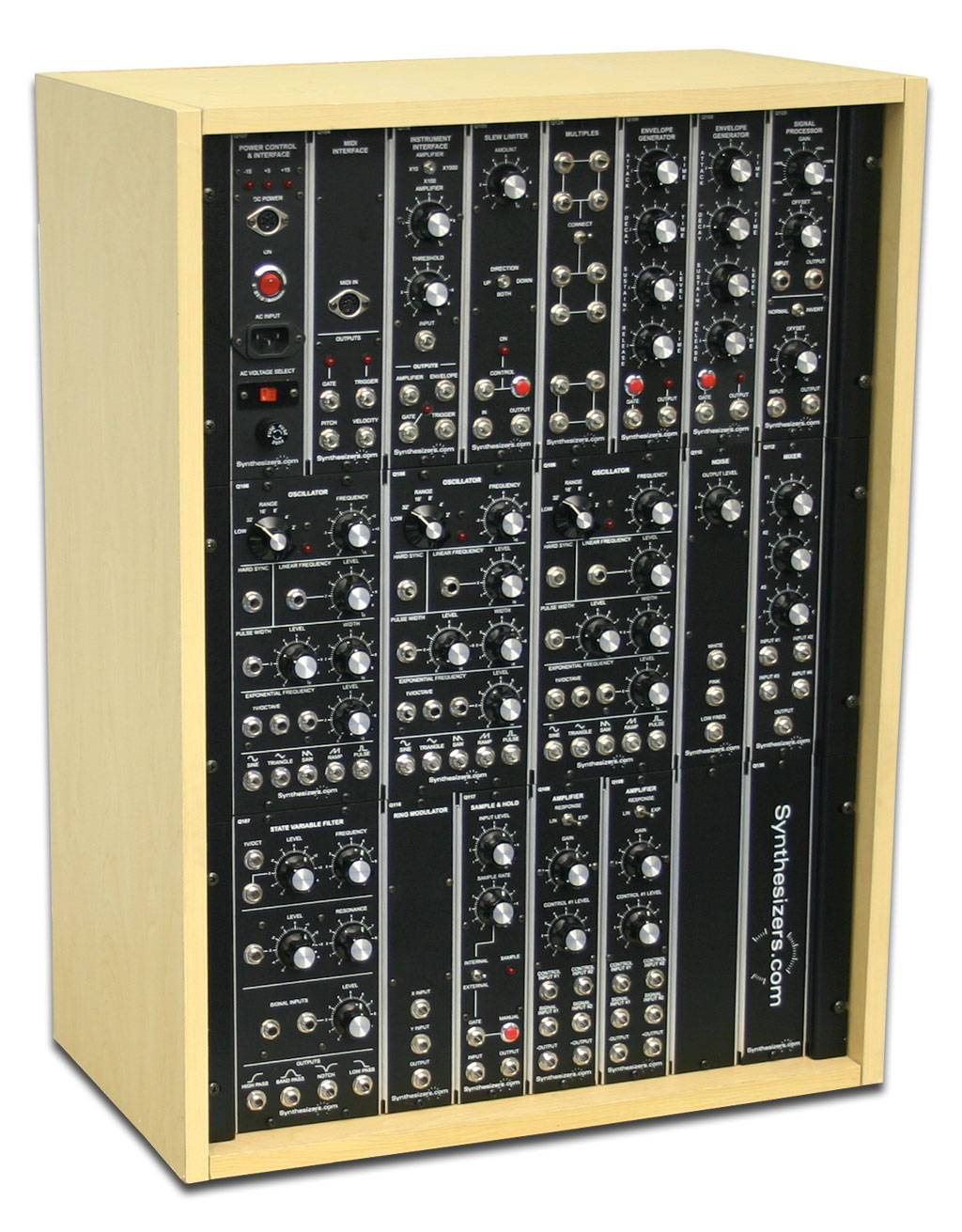
Rack-24 Synthesizer System

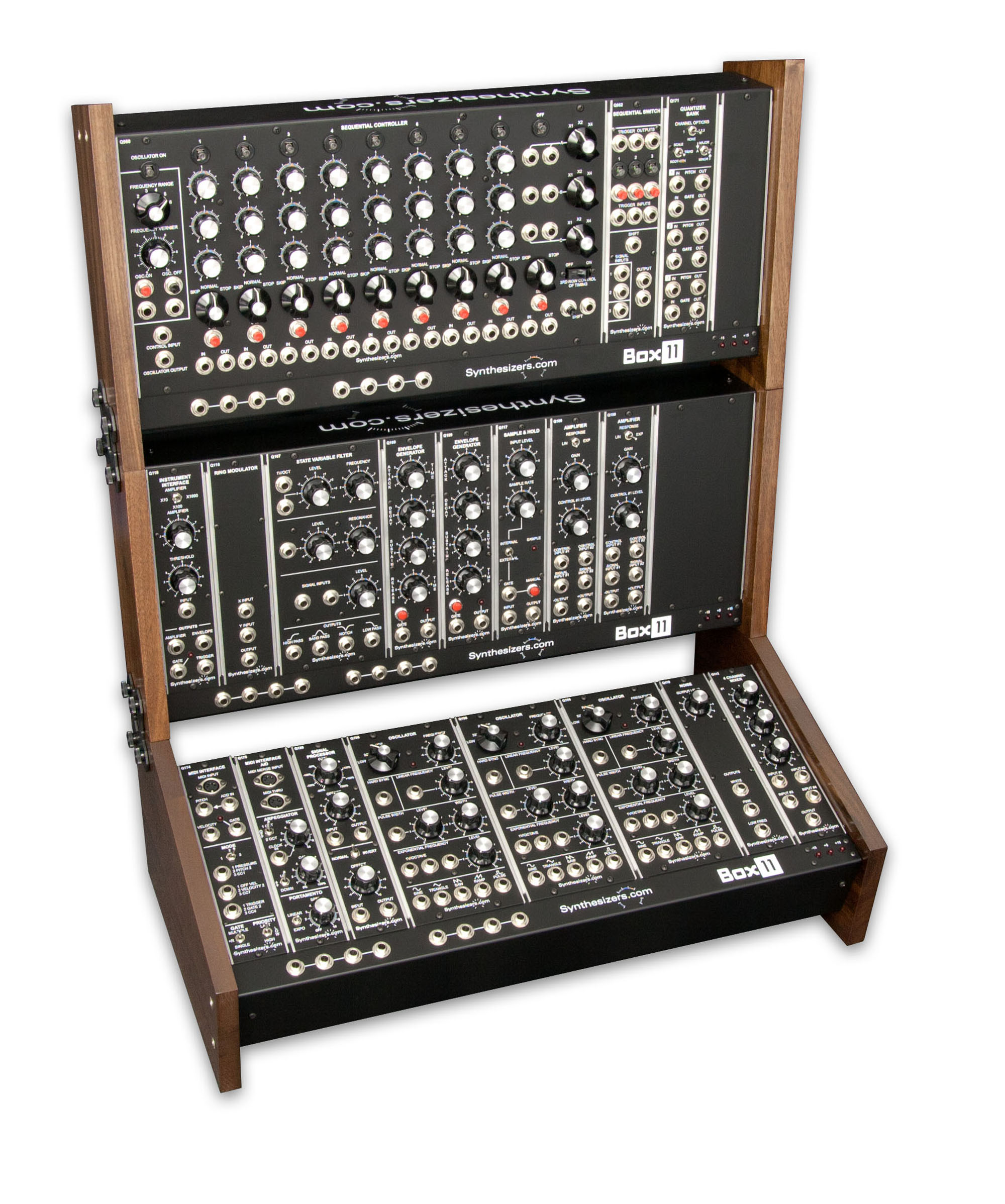
Box-33 Synthesizer System

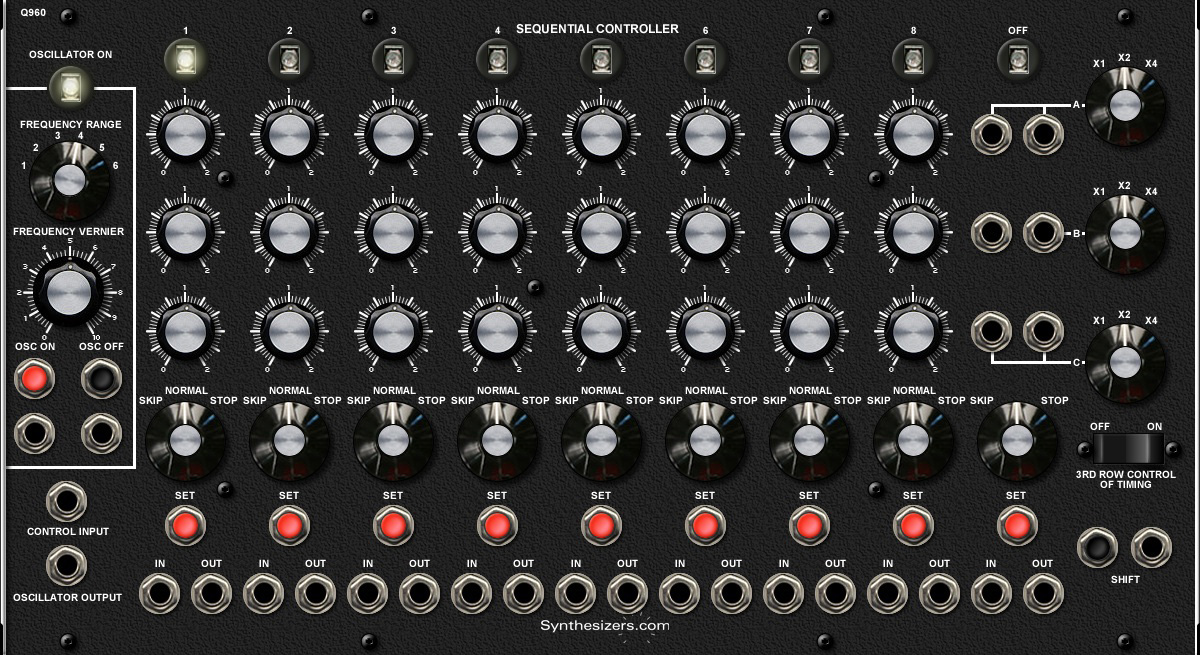
Q960 Analog Sequencer by Synthesizers.com

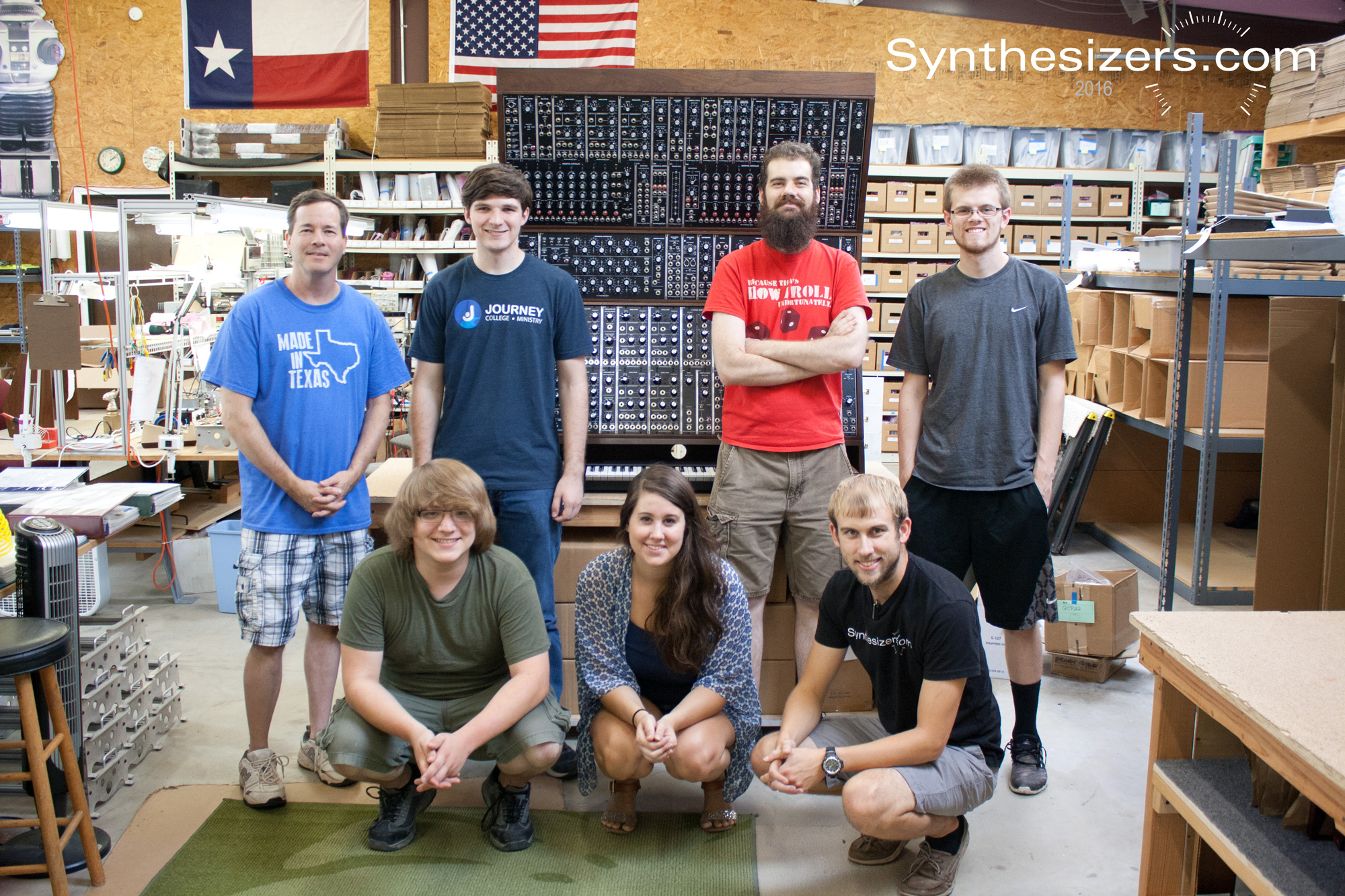
Crew at Synthesizers.com
