= Jordan Rudess =

American keyboardist (born 1956)

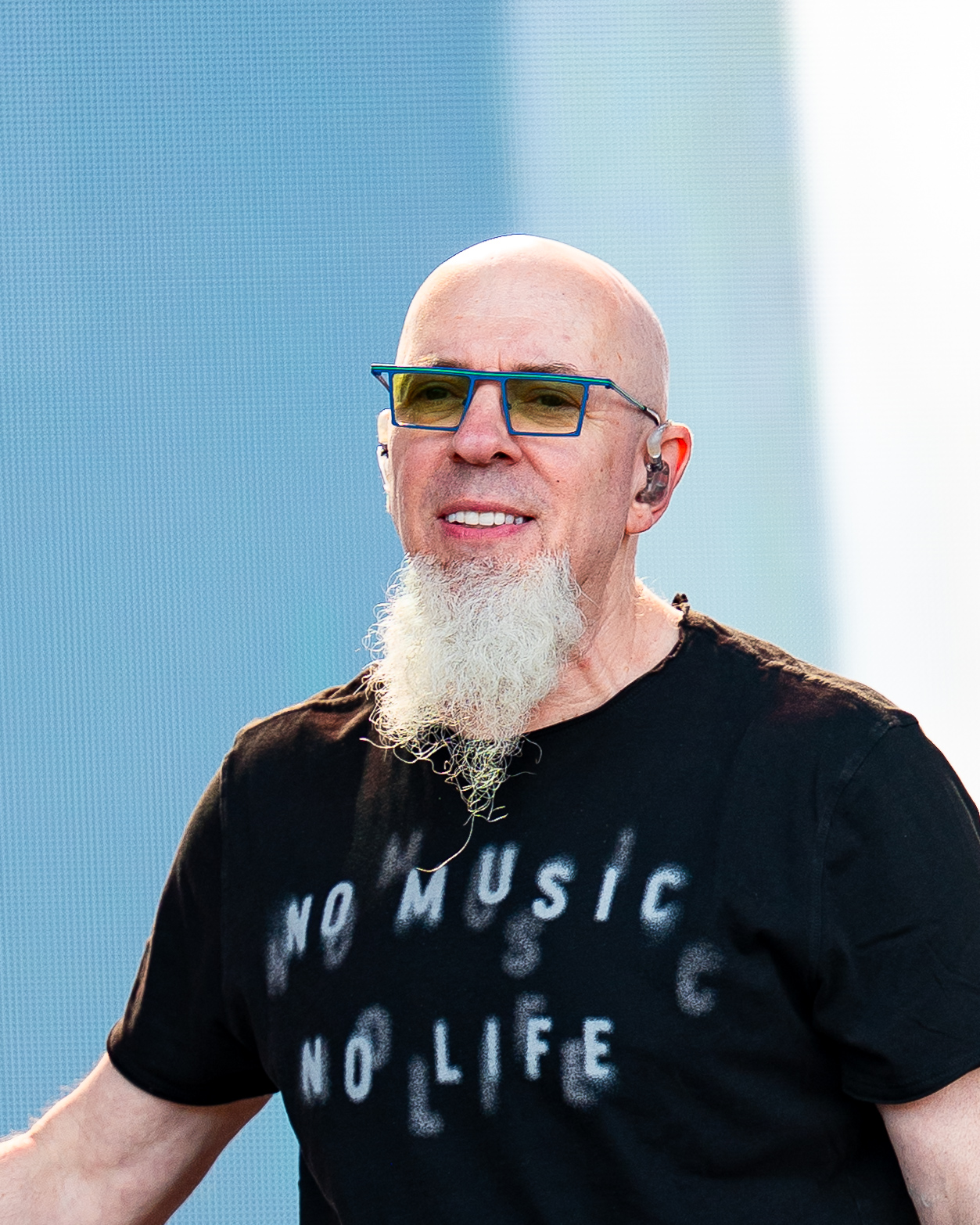
- Rudess with Dream Theater in 2025

Background information
- Born: Jordan Charles Rudes; November 4, 1956 (age 69); Great Neck, New York, U.S.
- Genres: Progressive rock; progressive metal; classical music; new-age music; electronic music
- Occupations: Musician; composer; software developer
- Instruments: Keyboards; guitar
- Years active: 1981–present
- Member of: Dream Theater; Liquid Tension Experiment
- Formerly of: Speedway Boulevard; Dixie Dregs; The Sea Within
- Website: www.jordanrudess.com

Jordan Rudess (born Jordan Charles Rudes; November 4, 1956) is an American keyboardist, composer, and software developer, best known as a member of the progressive metal band Dream Theater and the supergroup Liquid Tension Experiment.

== Early life ==
Rudess was born in 1956 in Great Neck, New York. His mother was the director of a music management company in Sea Cliff, New York, while his father owned a New York clothing manufacturer.

He was recognized by his second-grade teacher for his piano playing and was immediately given professional instruction. At nine, he entered the Juilliard School of Music Pre-College Division for classical piano training, where his first theory instructor was future collaborator Joseph Lyons. He studied at Juilliard for seven years under Katherine Parker and Adele Marcus.

== Music career ==
By his late teens, Rudess had developed an increasing interest in synthesizers and progressive rock music, citing his first experience in the genre as the Hammond playing and distorted stylistic expression of Jon Lord. Against the advice of his parents and tutors, he turned away from classical piano and pursued a career as a solo progressive rock keyboardist.

After Juilliard, one of his first bands was an "electronic space music band" called Complex. Formed by Rudess and former Juilliard instructor Joseph Lyons, along with Sal Gallina, they began playing college radio and house concerts. In January 1977, the band performed at Hansen Galleries in New York City. "This is music of real interest and vitality, more rhythmic and popularly appealing than most so-called 'serious' music," said the New York Times of the performance, "yet never so blatantly exploitive as to arouse real cynicism." That spring, the band Ocean Star released an album featuring music by Complex. That summer, Rudess accompanied Lyons for a residency at the Lexington Conservatory Theatre in Lexington, NY. Rudess served as assistant musical director and co-composed scores for the theater productions with Lyons, including the world premiere of The Prevalence of Mrs. Seale by Otis Bigelow. The duo also performed a series of concerts for the Earful concert series throughout the summer.

When Bleu Ocean was assembling a team of fellow drummers to perform on the song "Bring the Boys Back Home," featured on Pink Floyd's The Wall, he invited Rudess for the sessions, since Rudess had played drums as a child. However, Rudess's performance was rejected by producer Bob Ezrin. At that time, Rudess had already chosen keyboards as his main instrument.

Rudess was part of a studio project assembled by bubblegum pop impresarios Jerry Kasenetz and Jeffry Katz, who were also behind The Ohio Express and The 1910 Fruitgum Company. In 1980, they ventured into album-oriented rock with Speedway Boulevard, which also featured touring members of Ram Jam. The group never performed live and disbanded shortly after the album's release.

After participating in various projects during the 1980s, he gained international attention in 1994 when he was voted "Best New Talent" in the Keyboard Magazine readers' poll following the release of his Listen solo album. Two of the bands that took notice of Rudess were The Dixie Dregs and Dream Theater, both of whom invited him to join. Rudess chose the Dregs, primarily because being a part-time member of the band would have less of an impact on his young family, a choice he was not given with Dream Theater.

During his time with the Dregs, Rudess formed a "power duo" with drummer Rod Morgenstein. The genesis of this pairing occurred when a power outage caused all of the Dregs' instruments to fail except Rudess's, so he and Morgenstein improvised with each other until power was restored and the concert could continue. The chemistry between the two was so strong during this jam that they decided to perform together regularly (under the name Rudess/Morgenstein Project or later RMP) and have since released a studio album and a live record.

Rudess encountered Dream Theater once again when he and Morgenstein secured the support slot on one of Dream Theater's North American tours.

In 1997, when Mike Portnoy was asked to form a supergroup by Magna Carta Records, Rudess was chosen to fill the keyboardist spot in the band, which also included Tony Levin and Portnoy's Dream Theater colleague John Petrucci. During the recording of Liquid Tension Experiment's two albums, it became evident to Portnoy and Petrucci that Rudess was what Dream Theater needed. They asked Rudess to join the band, and when he accepted, they released their then-keyboardist Derek Sherinian to make way for him.

Rudess has been the full-time keyboardist in Dream Theater since the recording of 1999's Metropolis Pt. 2: Scenes from a Memory. He has recorded eleven other studio albums with the group: 2002's Six Degrees of Inner Turbulence, 2003's Train of Thought, 2005's Octavarium, 2007's Systematic Chaos, 2009's Black Clouds & Silver Linings, 2011's A Dramatic Turn of Events, 2013's Dream Theater, 2016's The Astonishing, 2019's Distance over Time, 2021's A View from the Top of the World, and 2025's Parasomnia. In addition, he has appeared on the live albums Live Scenes From New York, Live at Budokan, Score, Chaos in Motion, Live at Luna Park, Breaking the Fourth Wall, and Distant Memories – Live in London.

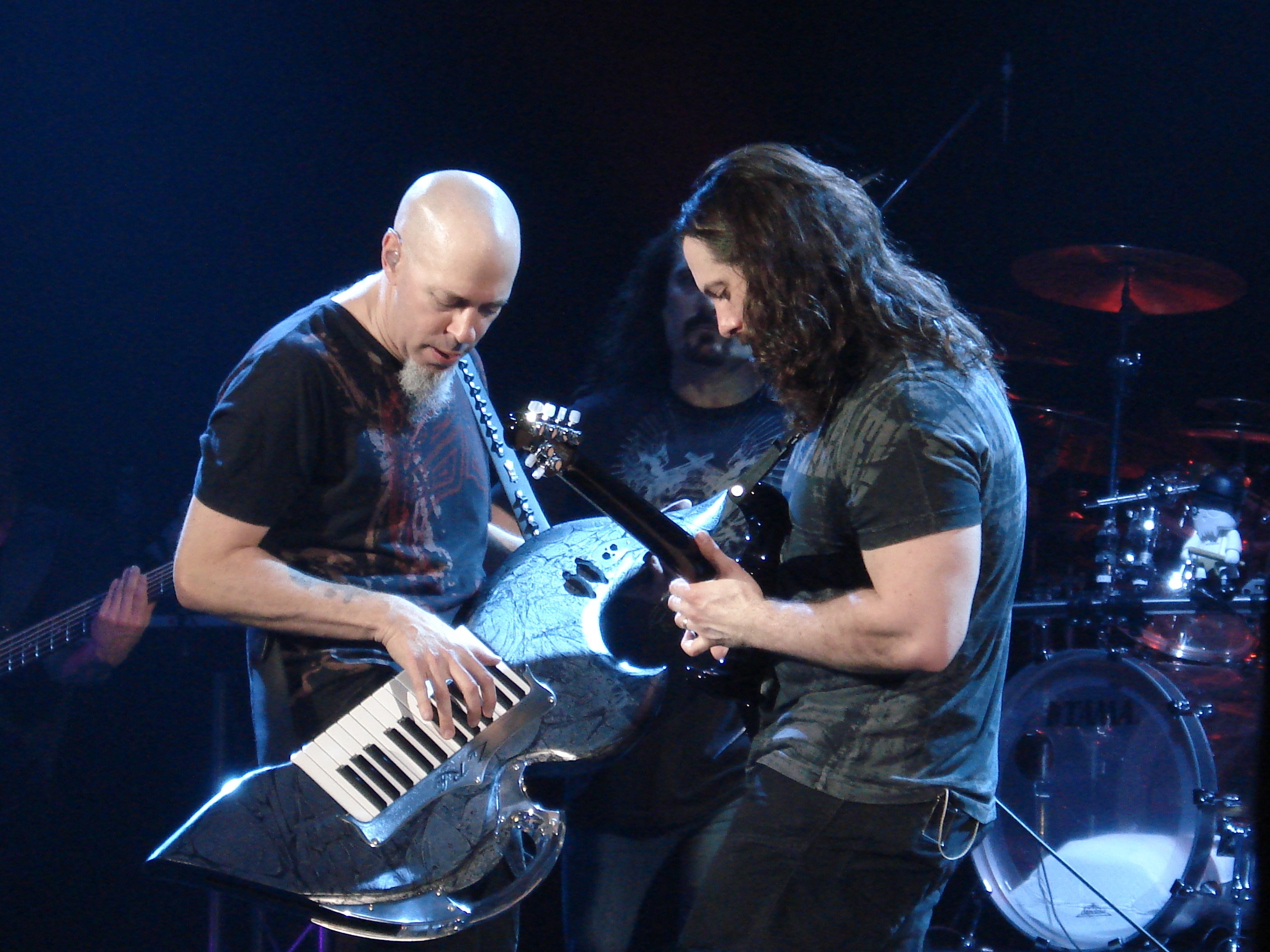
Rudess (left) with Dream Theater in 2008

In addition to working with Dream Theater, he occasionally records and performs in other contexts, such as a 2001 one-off duo performance with Petrucci (released as the CD An Evening With John Petrucci and Jordan Rudess), as well as backing up Blackfield on their first short US tour in 2005 and playing a solo opening slot for them on their second tour in 2007. He also contributed to Steven Wilson's albums Grace for Drowning and Insurgentes.

In 2010, Rudess composed "Explorations for Keyboard and Orchestra," his first classical composition. It was premiered in Caracas, Venezuela, on November 19, 2010, by the Chacao Youth Symphony Orchestra and guest conductor Eren Başbuğ. Rudess played all of the keyboard and synthesizer parts.

On July 28, 2011, in a poll conducted by MusicRadar, Rudess was voted the best keyboardist of all time.

Rudess appeared on the Ayreon album, The Theory of Everything, released on October 28, 2013.

=== Use of technology ===
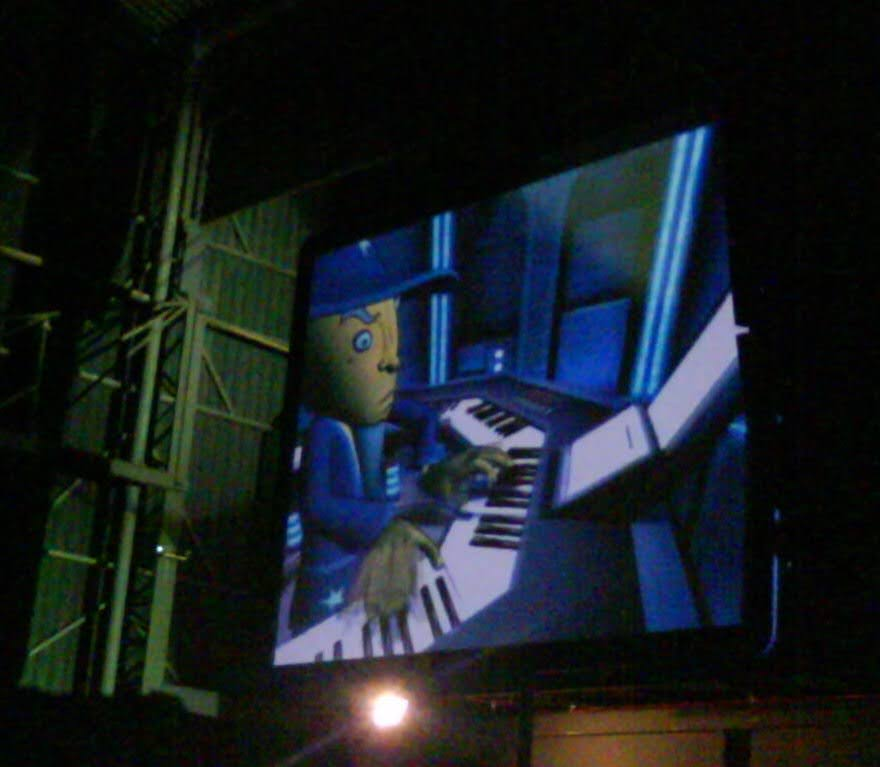
An automated virtual version of Jordan Rudess on a screen during a live performance in Porto Alegre, 2010

While many keyboard players in progressive rock tend to bring numerous keyboards on stage, creating large racks of instruments, Rudess samples sounds from other keyboards he owns and maps them to a single keyboard. Each "setup" assigns different sounds to various layers and key ranges of the keyboard controller; these setups are then arranged in the order they will be required for a gig and cycled through with a footswitch.

Starting in the 1990s, he used a Kurzweil K2600XS during live sets until switching in 2005 to Korg's Oasys workstation; he first utilized the Oasys station on Dream Theater's 2005–2006 20th Anniversary tour. He also employed a Muse Receptor hardware VST and a Haken Continuum X/Y/Z-plane MIDI instrument, triggering a Roland V-Synth XT and a synthesizers.com modular unit designed by Richard Lainhart and Roger Arrick. Influenced by Lainhart, Rudess was the first well-known keyboardist to bring a Haken Continuum onto a live stage. Rudess kept the Kurzweil for studio recordings and for some of his signature sounds, such as "the pig," which is often played in unison with the guitar or bass guitar.

In 2011, Rudess switched from the Oasys to the new flagship Korg Kronos. In 2019, he added a Roland Ax-Edge keytar and a Hammond XK-5 to his live setup, which were used on Dream Theater's 2019 record Distance over Time. His current live rig consists of the Kronos, along with a Continuum, a Hammond XK-5, a Roland AX-Edge, a lap steel guitar, a Harpejji, and an iPad.

Since 2001, Rudess has used custom-made swiveling keyboard stands on stage for both Dream Theater and his solo career, which are built by Patrick Slaats from the Netherlands. On Dream Theater's 2007–2008 "Chaos in Motion Tour," Rudess expanded his live setup with the addition of a Korg RADIAS, a Manikin Memotron, and a Zen Riffer keytar. Rudess stopped using his Synthesizers.com modular after the European leg of the tour due to its size and weight. He still owns the synthesizer and keeps it in his home studio. During the Progressive Nation 2008 tour, he introduced a Kaoss Pad 3 on stage for the closing medley.

For the 2009–2010 tour in support of Black Clouds & Silver Linings, Rudess introduced the Apple iPhone on stage, running an application called Bebot Robot Synth. Rudess originally used Bebot on the studio recording of "A Rite of Passage." In live performances, he utilized it on the same song, as well as in improvised solos featured in "Hollow Years" and "Solitary Shell."

On September 24, 2010, Rudess released the song "Krump," an electronica single, on iTunes. It featured the use of the new Roland Gaia, Roland's more recent keyboard.

In 2023 Rudess partnered with software developer Lightricks' report on the 'Creator Economy in the Age of AI', writing about "Shaping the Future of Music." In 2024 he used the company's LTX model to create his own music video.

== Other work ==
=== Music educator ===
Rudess was frequently asked about private music lessons, but his touring commitments kept him busy. He ultimately developed a course available through a book and video titled "Keyboard Wizardry" and "Total Keyboard Wizardry." He went on to create additional series such as "Keyboard Wisdom" and "Keyboard Madness." These included lessons on composition, improvisation, keyboard playing techniques, rhythm and pitch exercises, and aural training. Some of the courses even addressed sound design and approaches to arrangement, style, composition, and recording. These courses are available in music stores and on specific websites, including YousicPlay, MacProVideo, Patreon, Pianote, AskVideo, and many others, along with his very own Online Conservatory.

In addition to recording videos, eBooks, hardcopy books, and support materials, Rudess has also served as a guest lecturer both on campus and online during the lockdown (or, as he described it, when the world stopped... for a while). This has been an ongoing effort for quite some time. He has been a lecturer for various periods at numerous institutes, music schools, and music colleges. Jordan Rudess taught music, with a particular focus on keyboard techniques, at Berklee College of Music in the United States and at Swarnabhoomi Academy of Music (SAM) in India, and has conducted guest lectures at Stanford.

=== Software development ===
In 2010, Rudess started a software company called Wizdom Music. He partnered with artists such as Kevin Chartier, Felipe Peña, and Eyal Amir (from Project RnL), creating new types of musical instrumental user interfaces and experiences, sound synthesis, and innovative ways of recording and performing music with tablet computers.

Wizdom Music created the following software:

- SampleWiz – a touch screen-enabled sampler and self-sampler for the iPhone and iPad
- MorphWiz – a dynamic touch screen music creation controller for iOS, Android, and Windows 8-enabled touch pads and laptops
- Geo Synthesizer – a new digital music controller interface for the iPhone and iPad
- HarmonyWiz – a harmonic analysis and generator tool that can create multi-part harmonies from tracks either played or manually entered in-app
- EarWizard – a tool to help users recognize the pitch of notes and chords by ear, with progressive difficulty levels
- GeoShred – a guitar simulator app that can be played on a touch screen and allows various parameters of the instrument (e.g., string type, pick position, body type) to be varied

== Personal life ==
Rudess cites his influences as a keyboardist to include Keith Emerson, Tony Banks, Rick Wakeman, and Patrick Moraz. His favorite musical artists and groups include Gentle Giant, Yes, Genesis, Pink Floyd, Emerson, Lake & Palmer, King Crimson, Jimi Hendrix, Autechre, and Aphex Twin.

Rudess has perfect pitch.

== Discography ==
=== Solo albums ===
- Arrival (1988)
- Listen (1993)
- Secrets of the Muse (1997)
- A Christmas Carol by Charles Dickens (1999, soundtrack)
- Resonance (1999)
- Feeding the Wheel (2001)
- 4NYC (2002)
- Christmas Sky (2002)
- Rhythm of Time (2004)
- Unplugged (recorded 1996, released 2006)
- Prime Cuts (2006, compilation)
- The Road Home (2007, cover album)
- Notes on a Dream (2009)
- All That Is Now (2013)
- Explorations (2014)
- The Unforgotten Path (2015)
- Wired for Madness (2019)
- Heartfelt (2019)
- A Chapter in Time (2021)
- Rockestra (2021)
- Piano & Orchestra (2023)
- Permission to Fly (2024)

=== Dream Theater ===
- Metropolis Pt. 2: Scenes from a Memory (1999)
- Metropolis 2000: Scenes from New York (2001)
- Live Scenes from New York (2001)
- Six Degrees of Inner Turbulence (2002)
- Train of Thought (2003)
- Live at Budokan (2004)
- Octavarium (2005)
- Score (2006)
- Systematic Chaos (2007)
- Chaos in Motion (2008)
- Black Clouds & Silver Linings (2009)
- A Dramatic Turn of Events (2011)
- Dream Theater (2013)
- Live at Luna Park (2013)
- Breaking the Fourth Wall (2014)
- The Astonishing (2016)
- Distance Over Time (2019)
- Distant Memories – Live in London (2020)
- A View from the Top of the World (2021)
- Parasomnia (2025)
- Quarantiéme: Live à Paris (2025)

=== Project albums ===
- Rudess/Morgenstein Project – Rudess/Morgenstein Project (1997)
- An Evening with John Petrucci and Jordan Rudess (2000)
- The Official Bootleg (2001)
- Levin Minnemann Rudess (2013)
- From the Law Offices of Levin Minnemann Rudess (2016)
- Intersonic (2017) – Jordan Rudess/Steve Horelick

=== Liquid Tension Experiment ===
- Liquid Tension Experiment (1998)
- Liquid Tension Experiment 2 (1999)
- Spontaneous Combustion (2007, as Liquid Trio Experiment)
- When the Keyboard Breaks: Live in Chicago (2009, as Liquid Trio Experiment 2)
- Liquid Tension Experiment Live 2008 – Limited Edition Boxset (2009)
- Liquid Tension Experiment 3 (2021)

=== Guest appearances ===
- Vinnie Moore – Time Odyssey (1988)
- Tom Coster – Did Jah Miss Me? (1989)
- Jan Hammer-Tony Williams – Montreal Jazz Festival (1991)
- Annie Haslam – Blessing in Disguise (1994)
- Nóirín Ní Riain – Celtic Soul (1996)
- Kip Winger – This Conversation Seems Like a Dream (1997)
- Rhonda Larson – Free as a Bird (1999)
- Jupiter – Jupiter Project (1999)
- Paul Winter and The Earth Band – Journey with the Sun (2000)
- Scott McGill – Addition by Subtraction (2001)
- Prefab Sprout – The Gunman And Other Stories (2001)
- David Bowie – Heathen (2002)
- Jupiter – Echo and Art (2003)
- Neal Morse – ? (2005)
- Daniel J – Losing Time (2005)
- Neil Zaza – When Gravity Fails (2006)
- Behold... the Arctopus – Skullgrid (2007)
- K3 – Under a Spell (2007)
- Ricky Garcia – Let Sleeping Dogs Lie (2008)
- Steven Wilson – Insurgentes (2008–2009)
- Michel Lazaro – Vision (2010)
- Steven Wilson – Grace for Drowning (2011)
- Len & Vani Greene – Luminosity (2011)
- Affector – Harmagedon (2012)
- Sylencer – A Lethal Dose of Truth (2012)
- Mr. Fastfinger – In Motion (2012)
- Lalu – Atomic Ark (2013)
- Ayreon – The Theory of Everything (2013)
- Scream Maker – Livin' in the Past (2014)
- Eyal Amir – Bad News Jitterbug (2016)
- Virtual Symmetry – Message from Eternity (2016)
- Alex Lofoco – Beyond (2017)
- Gleb Kolyadin – Gleb Kolyadin (2018)
- The Sea Within – The Sea Within (2018)
- Dewa Budjana – Mahandini (2019)
- Richard Henshall – The Cocoon (2019)
- Nick D'Virgilio – Invisible (2020)
- Virtual Symmetry – Exoverse (2020)
- Mathieu Fiset – One More !!?!?? (2021)
- Alberto Rigoni – Songs for Souls (2022)
- Lalu – Paint the Sky (2022)
- Charlie Griffiths – Tiktaalika (2022)
- Gerald Peter Project – Incremental Changes Pt. 2 (2022)
- Jan Rivera – Existential Paranoia (2022)
- Mr. Fastfinger – Flight Mode (2022)
- Thrash Grandad – Brainslug (2023)
- Arch Echo – Final Pitch (2023)
