= Oberheim OB-SX =

Oberheim synthesizer

OB-SX
- Oberheim OB-SX - taken from Guitarcloud
- Manufacturer: Oberheim
- Dates: 1980 – 1983
- Price: US$2,995

Technical specifications
- Polyphony: 2, 4, or 6 voices
- Timbrality: Monotimbral
- Oscillator: 2 VCOs
- LFO: 1
- Filter: VCF with envelope
- Aftertouch expression: No
- Velocity expression: No
- Storage memory: Preset sounds –: 24 (early units); 48 or 56 (later units)

Input/output
- Keyboard: 48-key
- External control: CV/Gate (early units); "Oberheim System" digital interface (later units)

The Oberheim OB-SX was a preset-based polyphonic analog synthesizer by Oberheim, designed to be a smaller and more live performance friendly version of their OB-X.

== Specification ==
The OB-SX featured the same VCO/VCF/VCAs as the OB-X and the voice card had a similar design to the OB-Xa. The main differences between the OB-SX and the OB-X is the removal of some knobs (replaced with a few realtime filter and envelope controls), the ability to save patches in a ROM, and the keyboard being cut from 61 keys to 48. The OB-SX had an auto-tune button to automatically tune all of the oscillators using a microprocessor.

The OB-SX came with 24 presaved patches that were programmed by keyboardist Todd McKinney, with additional programming by Mike Christopher, Geoff Farr, Marcus Ryle, and Daniel Sofer. However, users could purchase and swap out the ROM with a new one containing different patches. Oberheim also allowed users to send in OB-X program cassettes to their factory, where they would make a custom ROM using the cassettes.

In later units of the OB-SX, Oberheim added compatibility with their DSX, a pre-MIDI digital interface dubbed the "Oberheim System", so users could program and play sequences on multiple Oberheim synths with a universal controller.

== Sales ==
During its production years of 1980–1983, the OB-SX had a retail price of US$2,995 (US$11,429.63 adjusted for inflation). Compared to the cheapest of the OB-Xs, which cost US$4,595 (US$19,907.45) in 1979, it was about a US$1,600 cheaper alternative.

== Notable OB-SX users ==
- Charles Bernstein (on the A Nightmare on Elm Street soundtrack)
- Geddy Lee
- Prince

== Hardware re-issues and recreations ==
In the 1980s, the German company Electronic Engineering Hoffmann (EEH) released the Syntec Banana, which was a cross between the OB-SX and the OB-Xa.

In May 2022, the Oberheim OB-X8, a new 8-voice analog synthesizer with the voice architecture and filters of four classic Oberheim models: the OB-X, OB-SX, OB-Xa, and OB-8, along with functionality and features not included on the original models, was announced. The new synthesizer is manufactured by Sequential in partnership with Tom Oberheim.

In 2024, GForce Software released the OB-EZ, a plugin synthesizer that used the appearance and layout of an OB-SX, but the color scheme and engine of the Oberheim 8-Voice.
