= Oberheim Prommer =

Monophonic sampler

Prommer
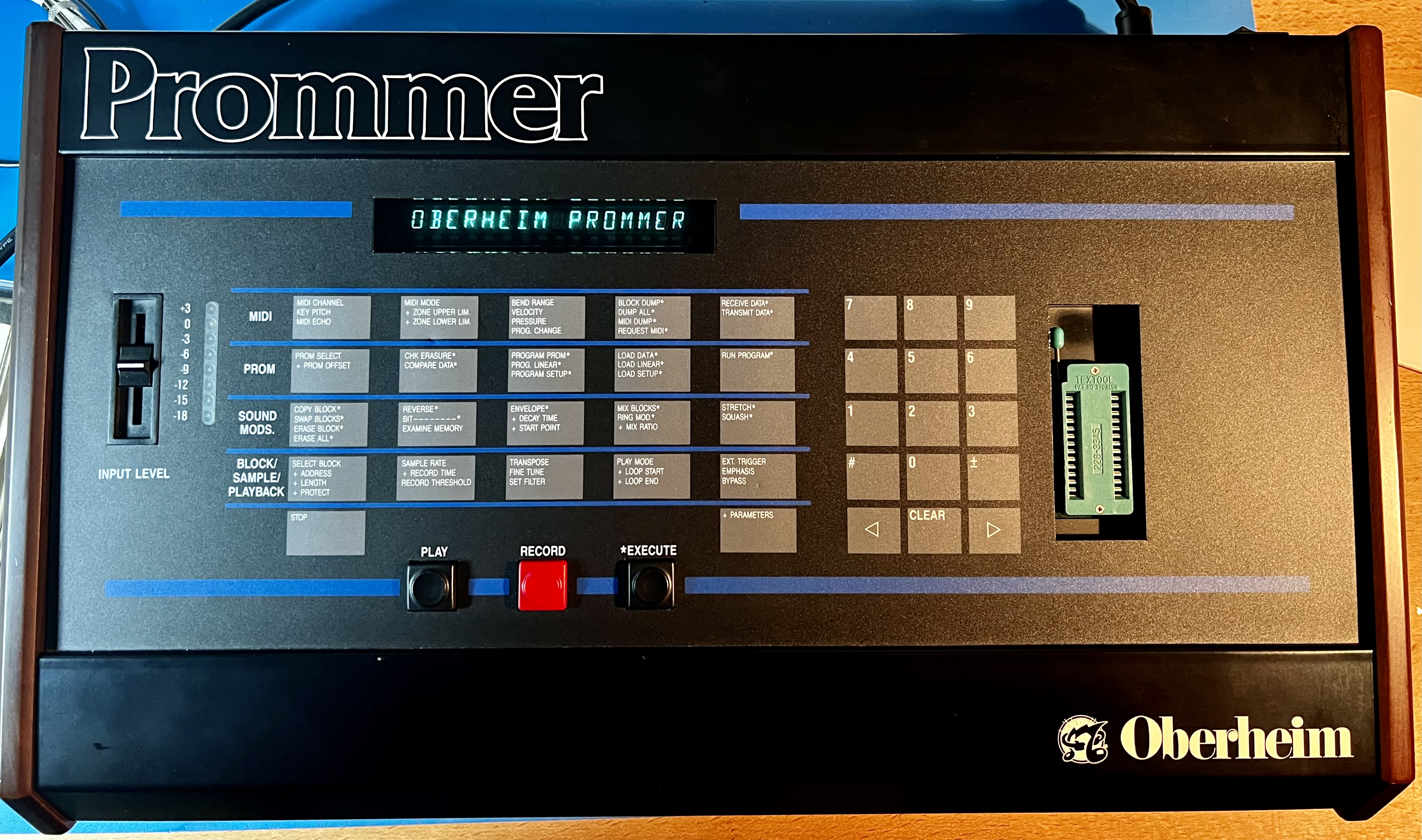
- Manufacturer: Oberheim
- Dates: 1983–1985
- Price: £949 GBP

Technical specifications
- Polyphony: 16 notes
- Timbrality: 1 part
- Synthesis type: Digital
- Attenuator: Attack, Decay

Input/output
- External control: MIDI In, out

The Oberheim Prommer is a monophonic sampler capable of programming EPROM chips for use in Oberheim DMX, Linn, Simmons, and Sequential drum machines, allowing you to use your own samples in these devices. The device can be triggered by MIDI, or via the pre-MIDI Oberheim Parallel Buss.

== Features ==
The Prommer uses the 8-bit COMDAC format and features 64k of RAM. the maximum sampling rate is 32 kHz.

== Editing of samples ==
- Attack
- Decay
- Reverse
- Ring modulation
- Stretch/squash
