= Oberheim OB-8 =

Polyphonic analogue synthesizer

OB-8
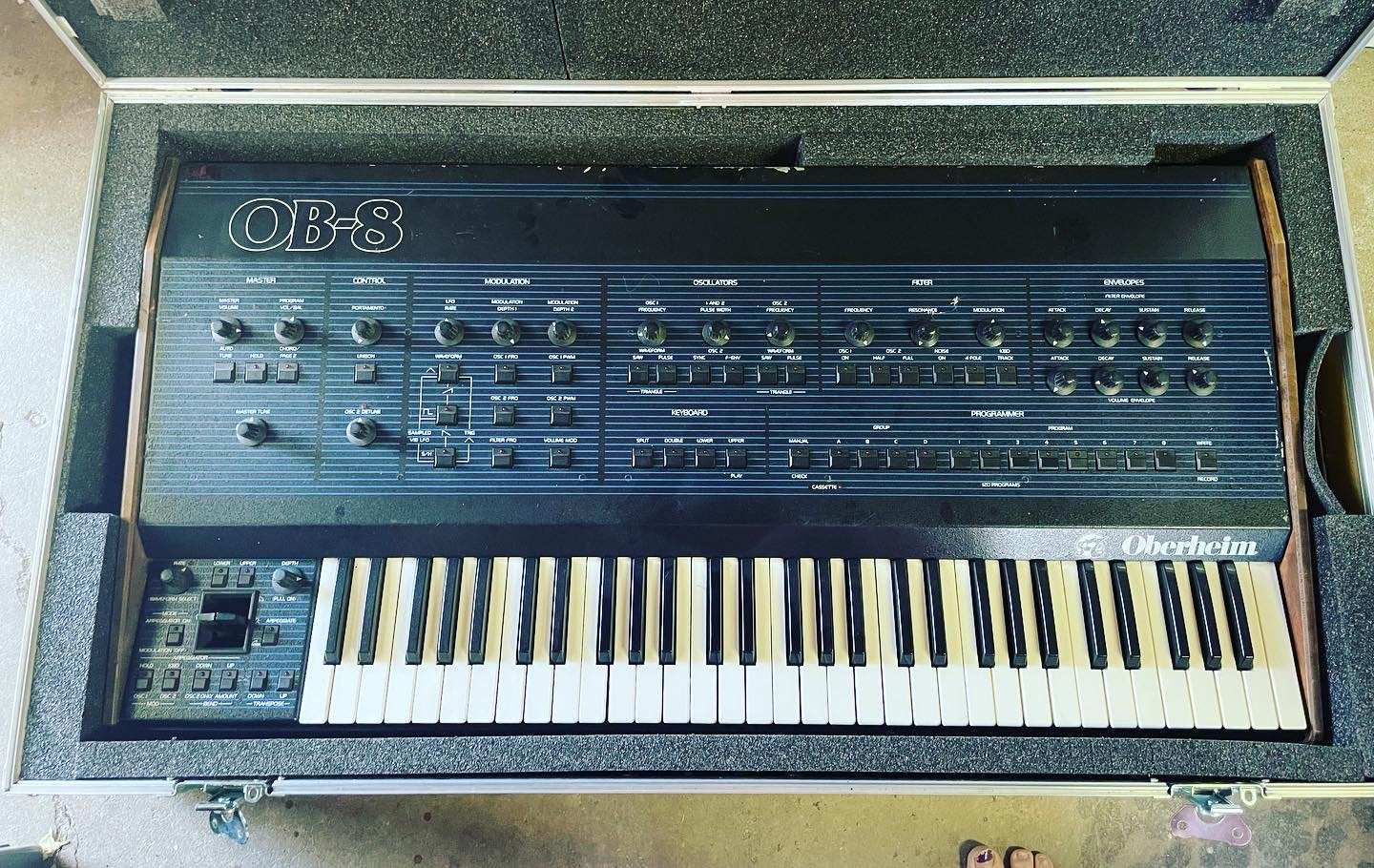
- The Oberheim OB-8
- Manufacturer: Oberheim
- Dates: 1983 - 1985
- Price: US$4395

Technical specifications
- Polyphony: 8 voices
- Timbrality: Bitimbral
- Oscillator: 2 VCOs per voice
- LFO: 3
- Synthesis type: Analog Subtractive
- Filter: Switchable 12dB/oct or 24dB/oct resonant low-pass
- Attenuator: 2 x ADSR (one for VCF & one for VCA)
- Aftertouch expression: No
- Velocity expression: No
- Storage memory: 120 patches 12 splits 12 dual
- Effects: none

Input/output
- Keyboard: 61-key
- Left-hand control: Pitch; Modulation
- External control: CV/Gate; MIDI; Cassette; Computer interface

The Oberheim OB-8 is a subtractive analog synthesizer launched by Oberheim in early 1983 and discontinued in 1985. As the fourth product in the OB-series of polyphonic compact synthesizers, the OB-8 was the successor to the OB-Xa. About 3,000 units were produced.

== Specification ==
The OB-8 features eight-voice polyphony, two-part multi-timbrality, a 61-note processor-controlled piano keyboard, sophisticated programmable low-frequency oscillation (LFO) and envelope modulation, two-pole and four-pole filters, arpeggiator, external cassette storage, MIDI capability and 120 memory patches, 24 bi-timbral patches, and used the Z80 CPU. The musician's interface also consists of two pages of front panel programmable controls, left panel performance controls and a set of foot pedals and switches.

== Notable OB-8 users ==
- Jack Antonoff
- Art of Noise
- Daft Punk
- Jimmy Jam and Terry Lewis
- Nik Kershaw
- The KLF
- Pet Shop Boys
- The Police
- Queen
- Steve Roach
- Simple Minds
- Soul II Soul
- Prince
- Van Halen

== Hardware re-issues and recreations ==
In May, 2022, the Oberheim OB-X8, a new 8-voice analog synthesizer with the voice architecture and filters of four classic Oberheim models: the OB-X, OB-SX, OB-Xa, and OB-8, along with functionality and features not included on the original models, was announced. The new synthesizer is manufactured by Sequential in partnership with Tom Oberheim.
