= Oberheim OB-1 =

Monophonic analog synthesizer

OB-1
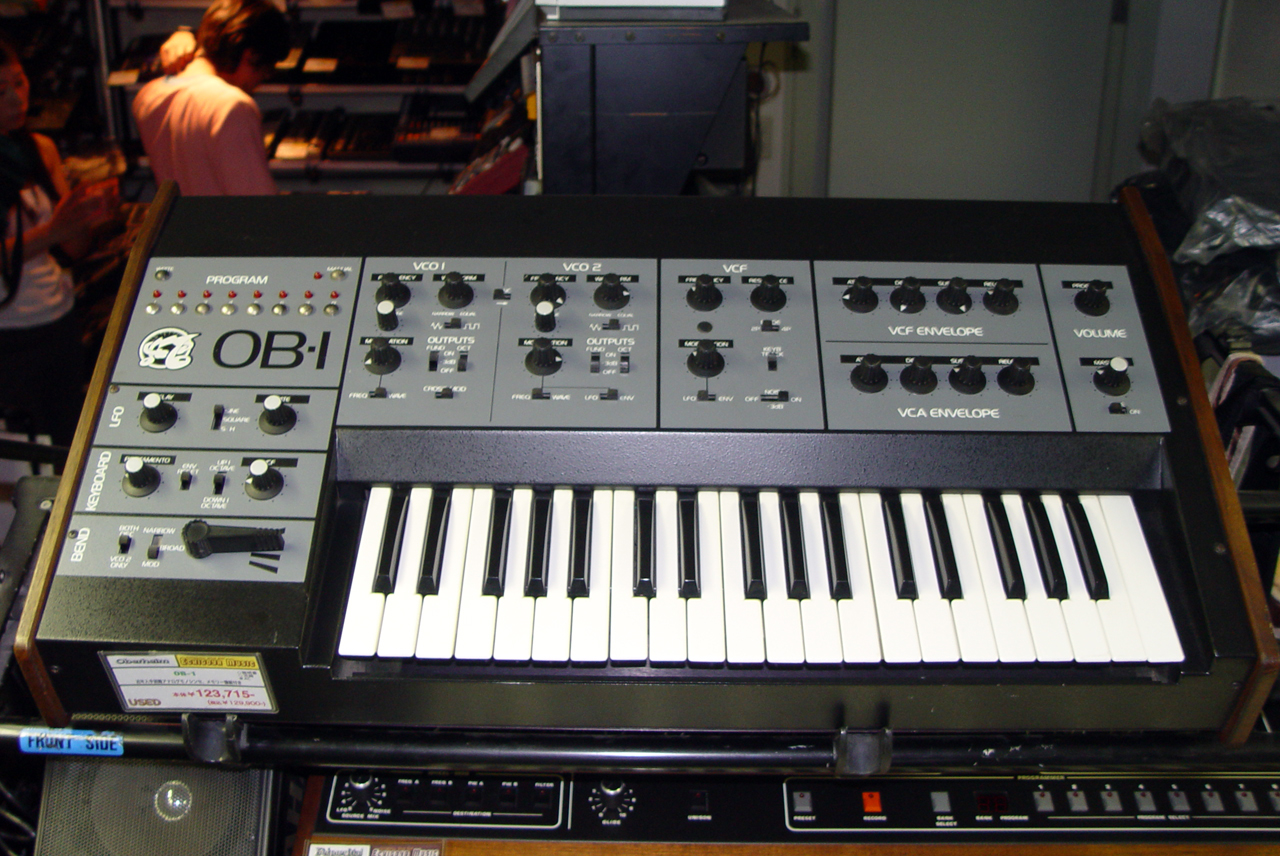
- Oberheim OB-1
- Manufacturer: Oberheim
- Dates: 1977 - 1979
- Price: US$1,895

Technical specifications
- Polyphony: Monophonic
- Timbrality: Monotimbral
- Oscillator: 2 VCOs
- LFO: 1
- Synthesis type: Analog Subtractive
- Filter: 1 VCF (2 or 4 pole switchable)
- Attenuator: 2 ADSR envelope generators (one for VCF, one for VCA)
- Aftertouch expression: No
- Velocity expression: No
- Storage memory: 8 patches
- Effects: No

Input/output
- Keyboard: 37 keys
- Left-hand control: Pitch bend/modulation lever
- External control: CV/gate

The Oberheim OB-1 was a monophonic analog synthesizer introduced by Oberheim Electronics in late 1977. With the ability to store and recall up to 8 instances of its sound settings, it was the first completely programmable synthesizer, and the first of Oberheim's OB-series of synthesizers.

== Development ==
Oberheim's OB-series was developed as a replacement for the previous generation of Oberheim SEM-based instruments and intended to be used for live performance. Building on the technology developed for their Polyphonic Synthesizer Programmer, Oberheim designed the OB-1 with the ability to store and recall up to 8 instances of its sound settings, making it the world's first completely programmable synthesizer. It originally sold for $1,895.

A slightly updated version, the Oberheim OB-1a, was introduced in 1979 that features the grey color scheme of its polyphonic sibling, the OB-X.

== Specification ==
The OB-1 features two voltage-controlled oscillators (VCOs), each selectable between either "Pulse Type" or "Saw Type" waveform, with continuously-variable control ranging from a square wave to a narrow pulse wave for the "Pulse Type" setting, or from a triangle wave to a sawtooth wave for the "Saw Type". The oscillators can be synced, and there is an available square wave sub-oscillator. The voltage-controlled filter is switchable between either 2- or 4-pole, with frequency cutoff and resonance controls. There are two ADSR envelopes: one for the filter, the other for the voltage-controlled amplifier. There are eight program memory buttons for storing and recalling the OB-1's settings.

There is a portamento knob allowing for adjustment of portamento amount, as well as a pitch bend/modulation lever.

== In popular culture ==
Notable users of the OB-1 include Vince Clarke and the bands Tangerine Dream, Rush, and The Grid.

A 2014 feature on the French radio station France Inter claimed that the OB-1 had been used by Star Wars sound engineer Ben Burtt to create the voice of R2-D2, and that the name of another Star Wars character, Obi-Wan Kenobi, derives from a transliteration of "OB-1". However, Star Wars was first released in May 1977, prior to the OB-1's release, and most sources credit the ARP 2600 synthesizer as being used to create R2-D2's voice.

== Software emulations ==
In 2024, GForce Software released the Oberheim OB-1 software synthesizer, an emulation of the OB-1.
