= Oberheim DSX =

Digital polyphonic music sequencer

DSX
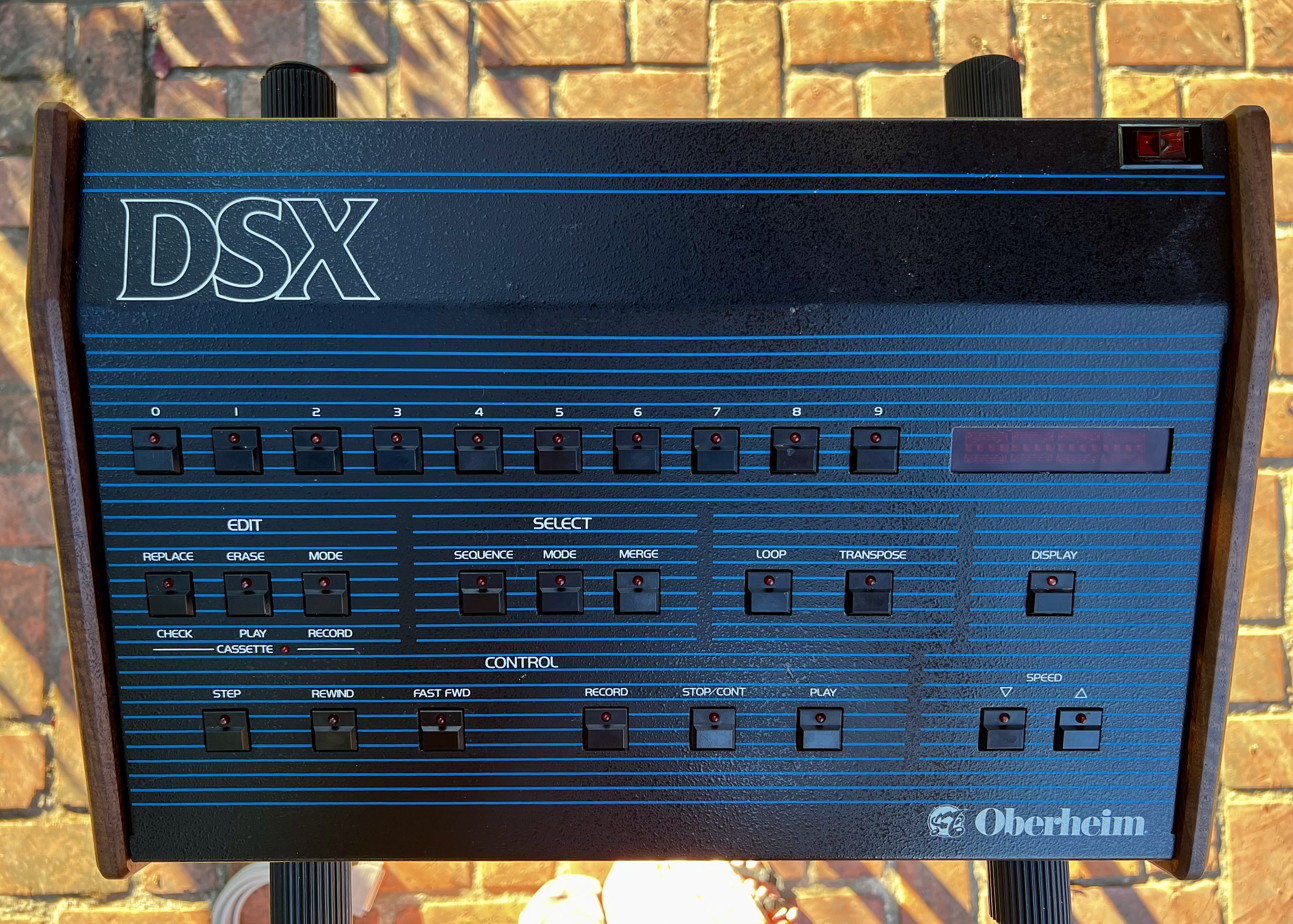
- Oberheim DSX - Digital polyphonic sequencer
- Manufacturer: Oberheim Electronics
- Dates: 1981–1984

Technical specifications
- Polyphony: 16 notes
- Timbrality: 1 part
- Synthesis type: Digital

Input/output
- External control: Proprietary parallel bus

The Oberheim DSX is a 9-track digital sequencer equipped with the Oberheim Serial Buss for connecting with the company's OB-Xa or OB-8 synthesizers and DMX drum machine. Connected and used together, Oberheim marketed these products as "The System". In addition to the Oberheim Serial Buss, the DSX has an 8-channel CV/Gate interface for sequencing traditional analog synthesizers.

== Features ==
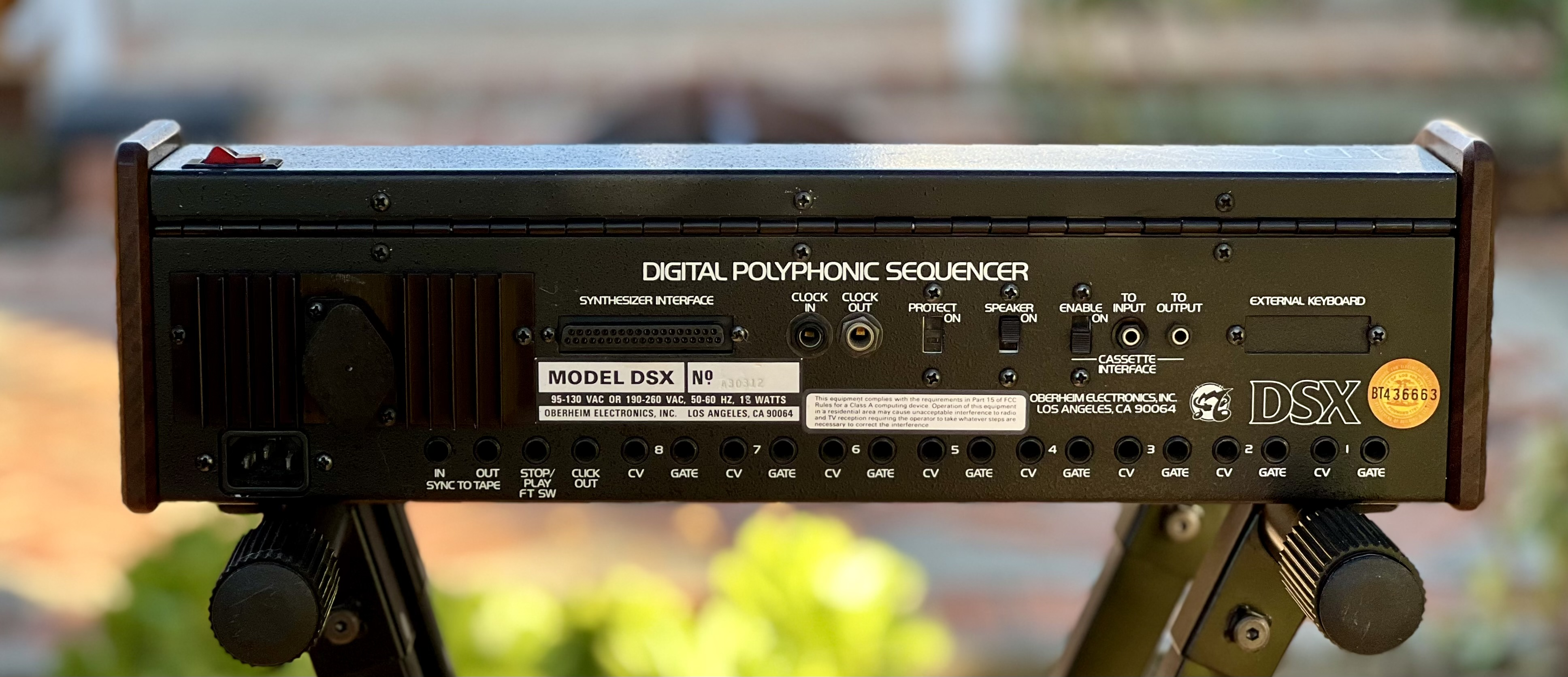
Rear connections

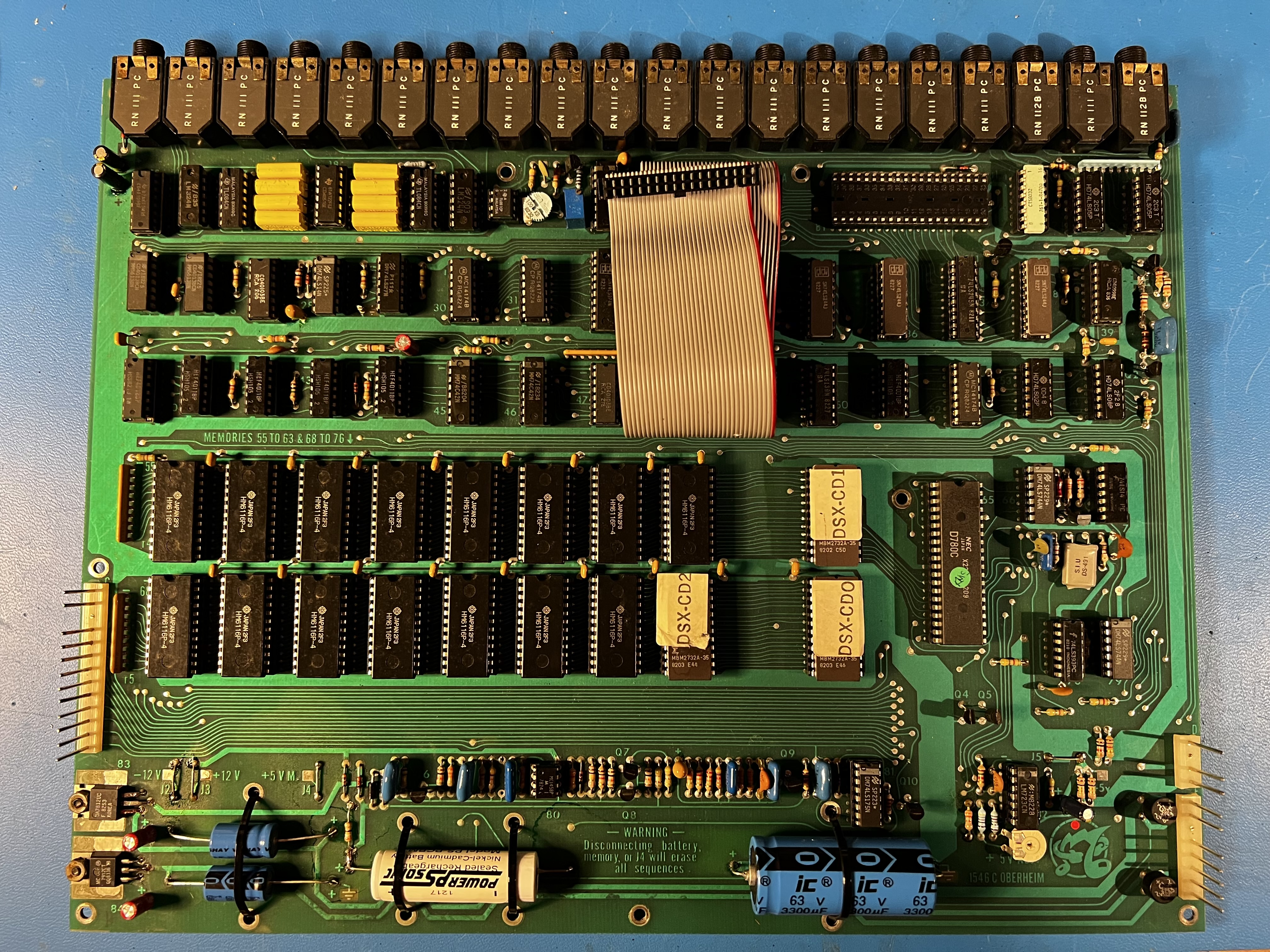
DSX main board

The DSX is capable of storing and sequencing over 6,000 events, over 10 songs of 10 patterns each. The DSX is capable of driving up to 16 voices concurrently. Sequences are stored in internal memory after power-off using static RAM which remains powered up from an internal NiCad battery.

The DSX equipped with the Oberheim Serial Buss, a pre-MIDI proprietary parallel bus designed to directly interface the DSX with Oberheim's OB-Xa or OB-8 synthesizers along with their DMX drum machine. Connection was via a heavy 1:1 cable, which plugged from the host DSX to the target synthesizer using a rear DB-37 connector. The combination of the DSX, DMX and either OB-Xa or OB-8 were marketed by Oberheim as "The System".

== Notable users ==
- Michael Beinhorn
- Trevor Horn
- Geddy Lee
- Mike Oldfield
- Steve Porcaro
- Steve Roach
- Sting
