= Oberheim Two Voice =

Oberheim synthesizer

Two Voice
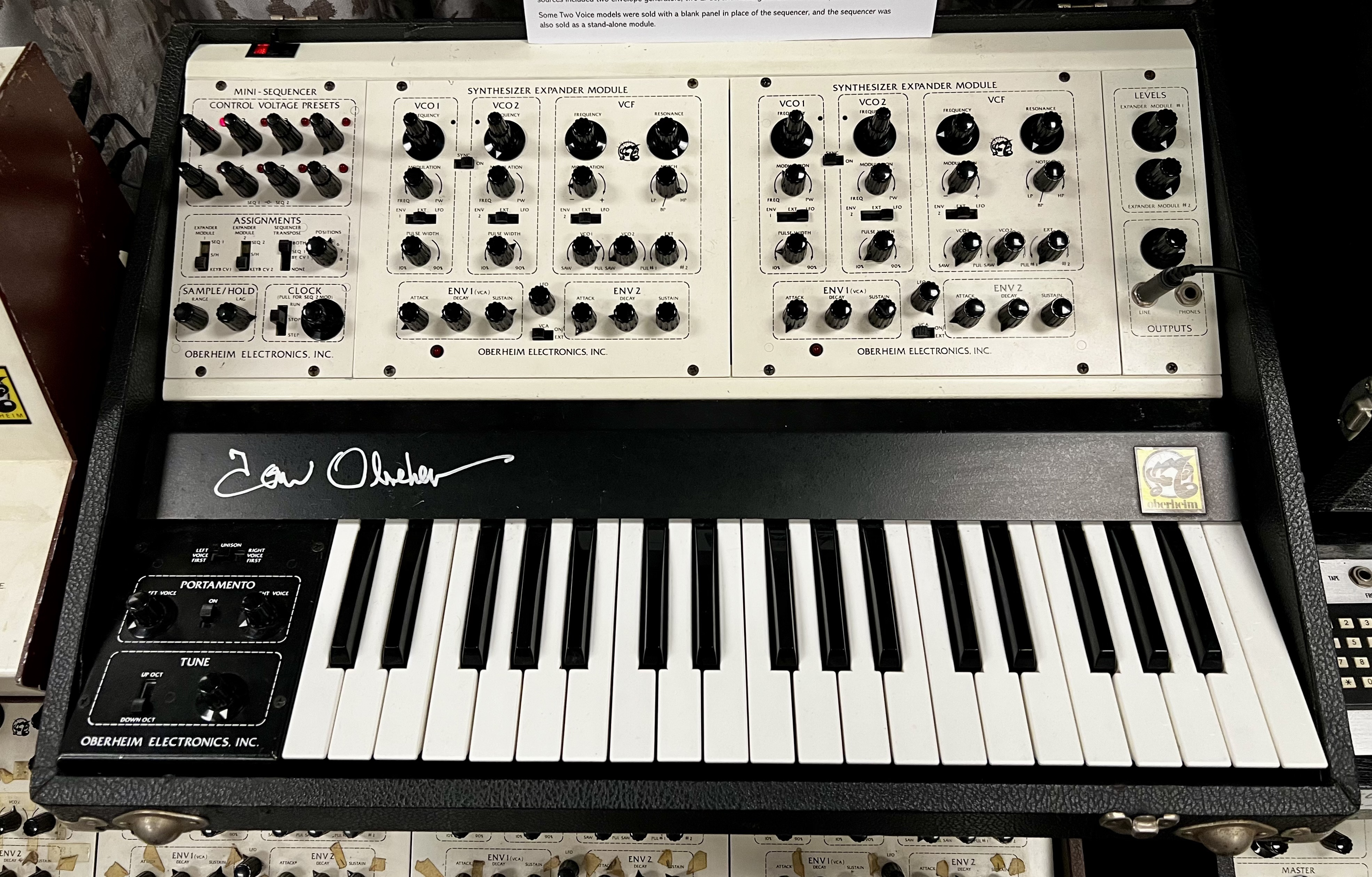
- TVS-1 owned by Peter Freeman
- Manufacturer: Oberheim
- Dates: 1975–1979
- Price: $2000 US

Technical specifications
- Polyphony: 2 voices
- Timbrality: Multitimbral
- Oscillator: 4 VCOs (2 per voice)
- LFO: 1 (triangle)
- Synthesis type: Analog subtractive
- Filter: 2 (1 per voice) (multi-mode with cutoff and resonance)
- Attenuator: 2 (Attack, Decay and Sustain)
- Aftertouch expression: No
- Velocity expression: No
- Storage memory: Optional external Polyphonic Synthesizer Programmer module
- Effects: No

Input/output
- Keyboard: 37 keys
- External control: CV/Gate

The Oberheim Two Voice (TVS) is an analogue synthesizer produced by Oberheim Electronics from 1975 to 1979. It can be operated in either polyphonic or monophonic mode, and includes an onboard 8-step sequencer. The Two Voice was the first of Oberheim's Polyphonic Synthesizer series, and one of the first commercially available polyphonic synthesizers.

== Development ==
At the start of 1975, Oberheim did not consider itself a synthesizer manufacturer. At the time, the company's business consisted of contract manufacturing Maestro-branded effects units, as well its own products, the DS-2 digital music sequencer and Synthesizer Expansion Module, which were intended as add-ons for Minimoog and ARP 2600 owners. When Norlin canceled several large Maestro orders, the company was forced to develop new products to replace those lost sales. By combining multiple SEM synthesizer modules with a digitally scanned keyboard developed by Dave Rossum and a two-channel sequencer, Oberheim created the Two Voice and Four Voice, the first two Oberheim Polyphonic Synthesizer models, and some of the first commercially available polyphonic synthesizers.

== Features and specification ==
The Two Voice combines two SEMs, each with two VCOs and a two-pole voltage-controlled filter that can operate as a low-pass, high-pass, band-pass, or band-reject filter.

== Famous Users ==
- Jean Michel Jarre
- Vince Clarke
- Vangelis

== See also ==
- Oberheim Two-Voice Pro – re-released version
