= Tom Oberheim =

American audio engineer (born 1936)

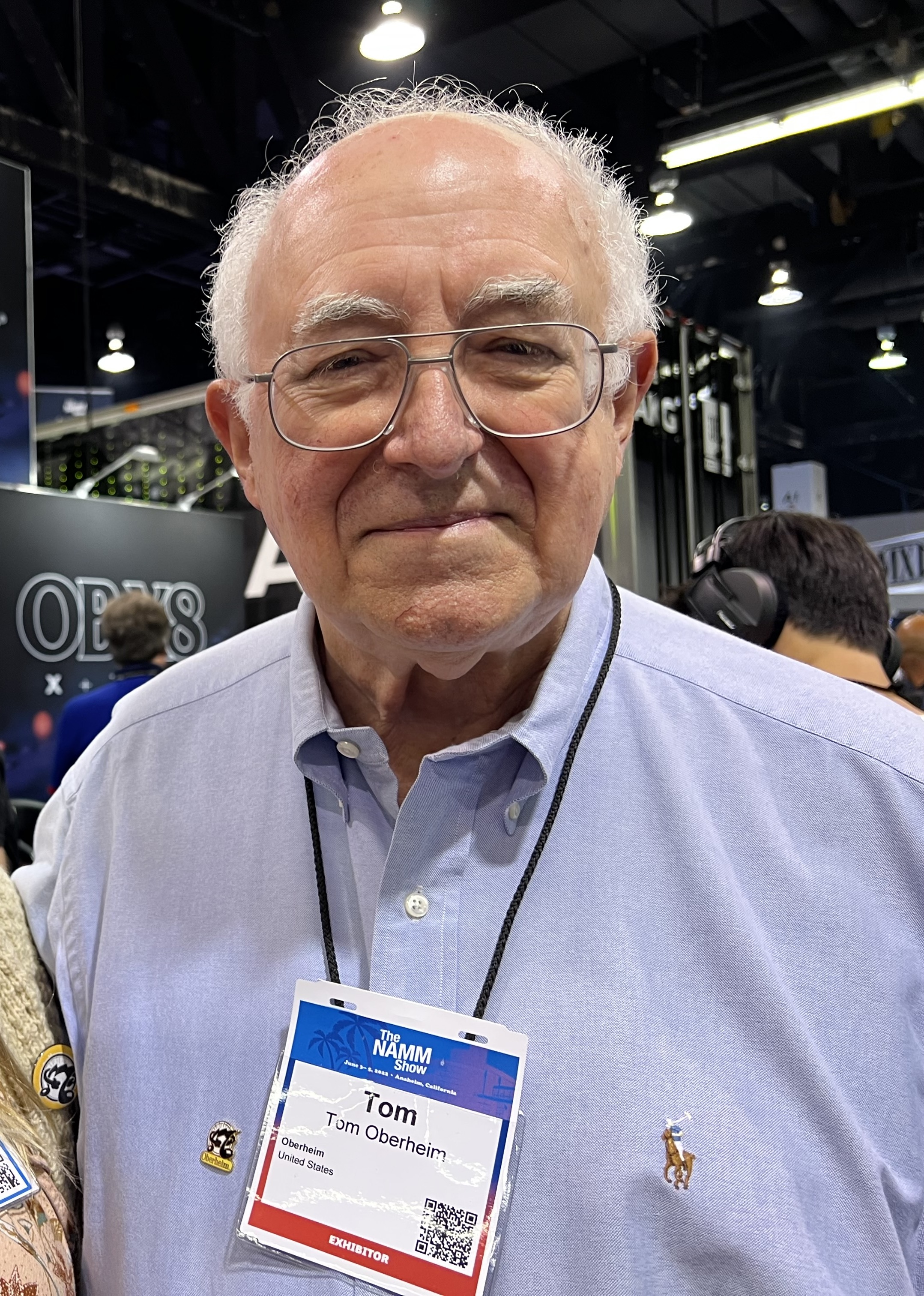
- Oberheim at the NAMM Show in 2022
- Born: Thomas Elroy Oberheim; July 7, 1936 (age 90); Manhattan, Kansas, U.S.
- Spouse: Jill Oberheim
- Engineering career
- Discipline: Audio engineering Electronic engineering
- Institutions: University of California, Los Angeles
- Projects: Oberheim Electronics
- Website: https://www.tomoberheim.com

Thomas Elroy Oberheim (born July 7, 1936) is an American audio engineer and electronics engineer best known for designing effects processors, analog synthesizers, sequencers, and drum machines. He has been the founder of four audio electronics companies, most notably Oberheim Electronics. He was also a key figure in the development and adoption of the MIDI standard. He is also a trained physicist.

== Early life and education ==
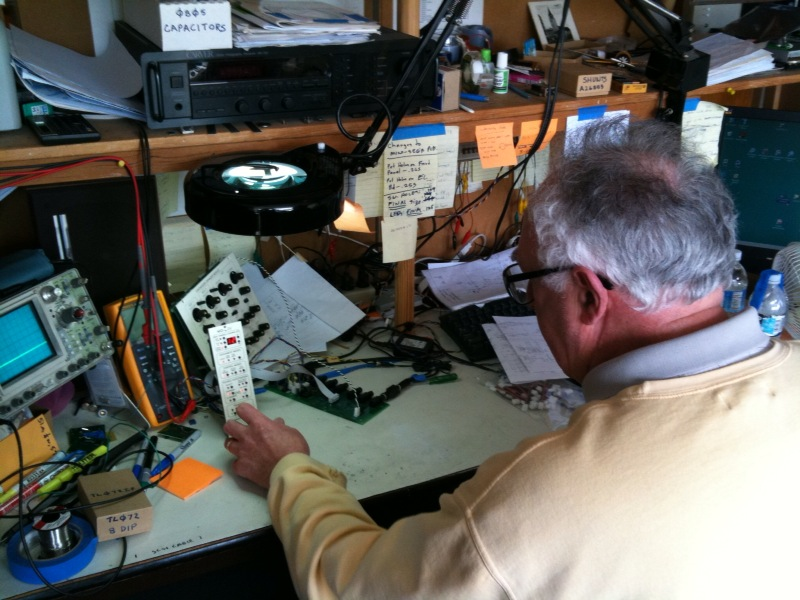
Oberheim at his workbench in 2010

Oberheim was born and raised in Manhattan, Kansas, also the home of Kansas State University. Beginning in junior high school, he put his interest in electronics into practice by building hi-fi components and amplifiers for friends. A fan of jazz music, Oberheim decided to move to Los Angeles after seeing an ad on the back of Downbeat Magazine about free jazz performances at a club there. He arrived in Los Angeles in July 1956 at the age of 20 with $10 in his pocket. He worked as a draftsman trainee at NCR Corporation where he was inspired to become a computer engineer. Oberheim enrolled at UCLA, studying computer engineering and physics while also taking music courses. Over the next nine years he worked toward his physics degree, serving in the U.S. Army for a short period of time, harmonizing with the Gregg Smith Singers, and working jobs at computer companies (most notably Abacus, where he first began designing computers).

Oberheim was attending a class during his last semester at UCLA when he met and became friends with trumpet player Don Ellis, and keyboardist Joseph Byrd of the band The United States of America, who were attending the same class. Oberheim stayed in touch with both Ellis and Byrd after leaving UCLA, and ended up building an amplifier for Ellis to use for his public address system. Oberheim also built guitar amplifiers for The United States of America, and their lead singer Dorothy Moskowitz asked him to build a ring modulator for the band (Joseph Byrd had used one while a band member, and Moskowitz wanted one for the band's new keyboardist, Richard Grayson). While ring modulator circuit information was readily available, it was a 1961 article by Harald Bode in Electronics Magazine that gave Oberheim the information he needed to design and hand-build one for musical application. Oberheim also built a ring modulator for Don Ellis. After hearing about Oberheim's device, film composer Leonard Rosenman contacted him for a ring modulator to use in the production of the Beneath the Planet of the Apes film soundtrack. Oberheim, who had grown tired of designing computer equipment, found far greater personal satisfaction in designing equipment used by artists to create music and the positive feedback he received from musicians like Herbie Hancock and Jan Hammer.

== Career ==
=== Maestro effects units ===
In 1969, the Chicago Musical Instruments Company (CMI) approached Oberheim about his ring modulator, wanting him to become one of their manufacturing contractors. Oberheim raised approximately $6,000 from friends to start Oberheim Electronics. (One of the original investors was Tony Russo, but Oberheim later returned Russo's investment at Russo's request.) Oberheim produced his ring modulator, which CMI marketed as the Maestro RM-1A. At the time, Oberheim was also spending time with the band Bryndle, and had developed a fascination with the sound of instruments being played through a Leslie rotary speaker. This inspired Oberheim to design and build a phase shifter effects unit to imitate that sound. Maestro marketed the phase shifter as the PS-1. The PS-1 was a huge success, selling nearly 25,000 units over the next three years. Oberheim went on to design other products for Maestro, including the Universal Synthesizer for guitars.

=== Oberheim ===
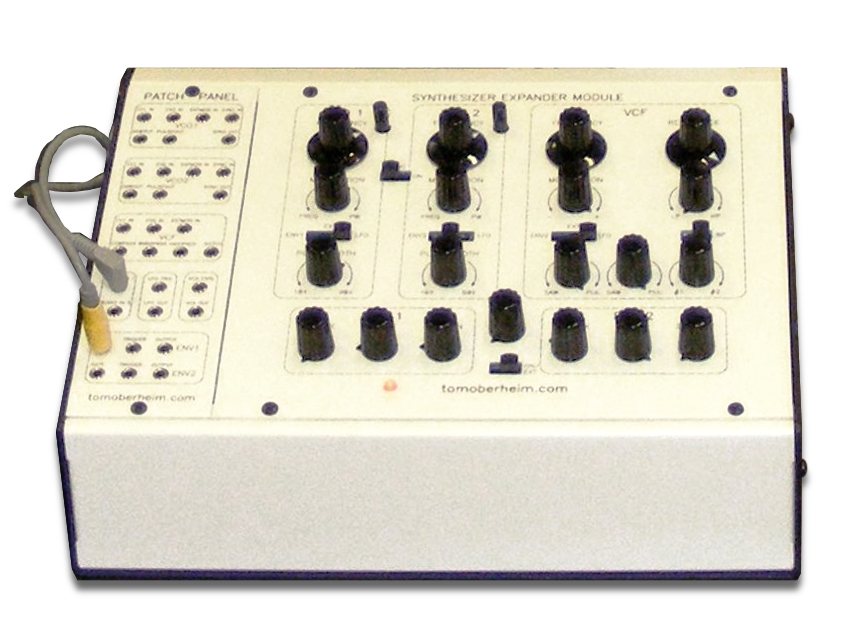
SEM (2009 update of 1974 original)

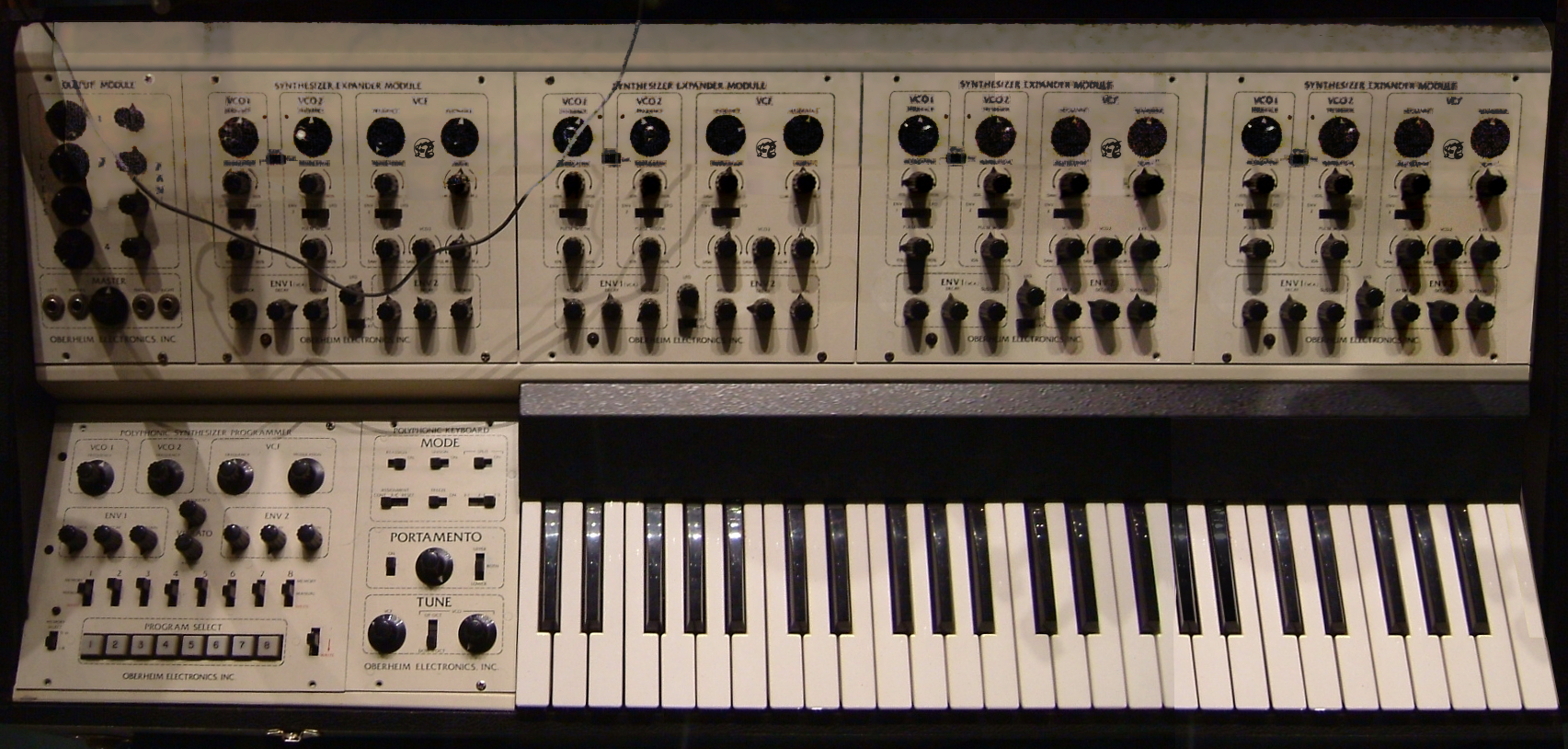
4-Voice (1975)

Oberheim's forays into the design of equipment to be used by musicians continued to evolve. His associations with Richard Grayson and later Paul Beaver nurtured an interest in synthesizers, and at the 1971 NAMM Show, Oberheim approached Alan R. Pearlman, founder of ARP Instruments, asked to become the company's Los Angeles dealer, and subsequently became ARP's first dealer on the west coast, selling ARP 2600 synthesizers to musicians in the Los Angeles area, including Leon Russell, Robert Lamm, and Frank Zappa. Having access to ARP's schematics, Oberheim noticed that the ARP 2500 had a feature that allowed two notes to be played simultaneously (a capability of neither the 2600 nor other commercially available synthesizers at the time), and Oberheim designed a modification to the ARP 2600 that enabled it to do the same thing. Using two of these modified ARP 2600s, Oberheim and Grayson performed concerts together.

Oberheim further expanded on the performance capabilities of 2-note polyphony in 1973, using his computer engineering experience to design the DS-2, one of the first digital-electronics-based music sequencers. The sequencer would completely control (i.e., "play from memory") the synthesizer; however, leaving the musician with no way to play along live on the instrument's keyboard, this also identified a problem that inspired Oberheim to design the Synthesizer Expander Module (SEM) with the design assistance of Dave Rossum (later of E-mu Systems fame), that facilitated simultaneously recorded + live playing (akin to the multi-track audio recording practice of "overdubbing"). Oberheim introduced the SEM, the first synthesizer bearing his company's name, at the Audio Engineering Society convention in Los Angeles in May 1974.

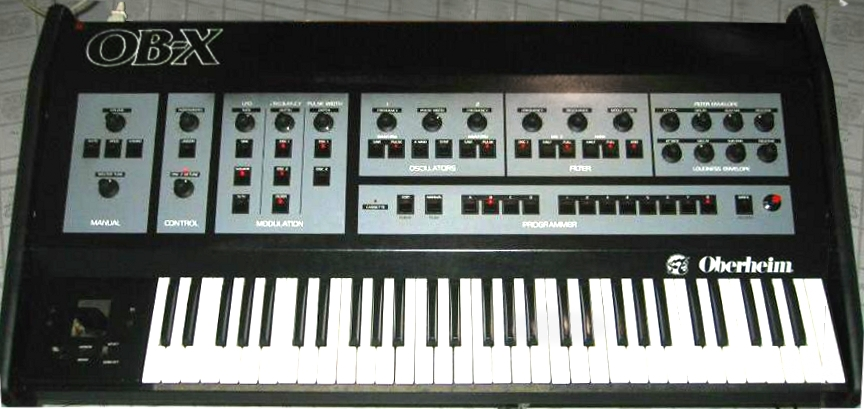
OB-X (1979)

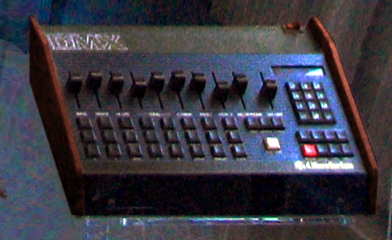
DMX (1980)

The following year, when Norlin (CMI's successor) cancelled several large orders for Oberheim's Maestro products, Oberheim shifted his design and manufacturing efforts to replace that lost business. He expanded the SEM concept, and again enlisting the expertise of Dave Rossum and Scott Wedge of E-mu Systems, combining the SEM with a digital keyboard, created the Oberheim 2-Voice and 4-Voice synthesizers, the first commercially available polyphonic music synthesizers. By combining more single-voice synthesizer modules together, Oberheim expanded the concept to the Oberheim 8-Voice synthesizer, introduced in 1976. Realizing that programming the 4-Voice on stage was impractical, he designed the Polyphonic Synthesizer Programmer, an integrated circuit memory for storing the synthesizer's sound settings, another industry first. Integrating this technology into a synthesizer, Oberheim introduced the OB1, the first programmable monophonic synthesizer, in 1977.

By 1980, Oberheim's products, by then including synthesizers, a polyphonic digital sequencer (the DSX), and a sampled-sound drum machine (the DMX) were designed to be combined to form a complete system, and could be interconnected by a proprietary Oberheim parallel bus interface that pre-dated MIDI.

With the company now gathering pace, from the turn of the 1980s Oberheim now streamlined his polyphonic synthesizers into a series of major integrated keyboard instruments which proved highly popular, coming to define many records of the era, to a similar extent to Sequential's Prophet 5. The Oberheim company first produced the OB-X in 1979, the OB-Xa in 1980-81, and the OB-8 in 1983, as well as the Matrix-12 and Matrix-6 from the mid-1980s.

=== MIDI proponent ===
In June 1981, Roland's Ikutaro Kakehashi approached Oberheim with the idea of standardizing a communication protocol between electronic music instruments. Oberheim discussed the idea with Dave Smith of Sequential Circuits, and in November, Smith formally presented the idea to the Audio Engineering Society. Smith finalized the MIDI specification and together, Kakehashi, Oberheim, and Smith successfully coordinated the support of all major manufacturers to widely adopt the new MIDI standard.

=== Marion Systems and SeaSound ===
By May 1985, Oberheim Electronics was struggling and became ECC/Oberheim, owned by Oberheim's ex-lawyer. Later that same year, the Oberheim name was sold to Gibson Guitar Company. Tom Oberheim departed the company two years later and filed a lawsuit against his ex-lawyer for legal malpractice.

In 1987, Oberheim formed Marion Systems (named after his daughter Emily Marion) in Santa Monica and later Lafayette in California. During this time, Oberheim performed consulting work for Roland and Akai, and produced a 12-bit to 16-bit option for Akai's S900 sampler. Oberheim also developed the Marion Systems MSR-2, a modular synthesizer concept.

In the year 2000 after Marion Systems, Oberheim founded SeaSound, a manufacturer of audio interfaces. Oberheim also served as an advisor to Muse Research.

=== Return to synthesizer manufacturing ===
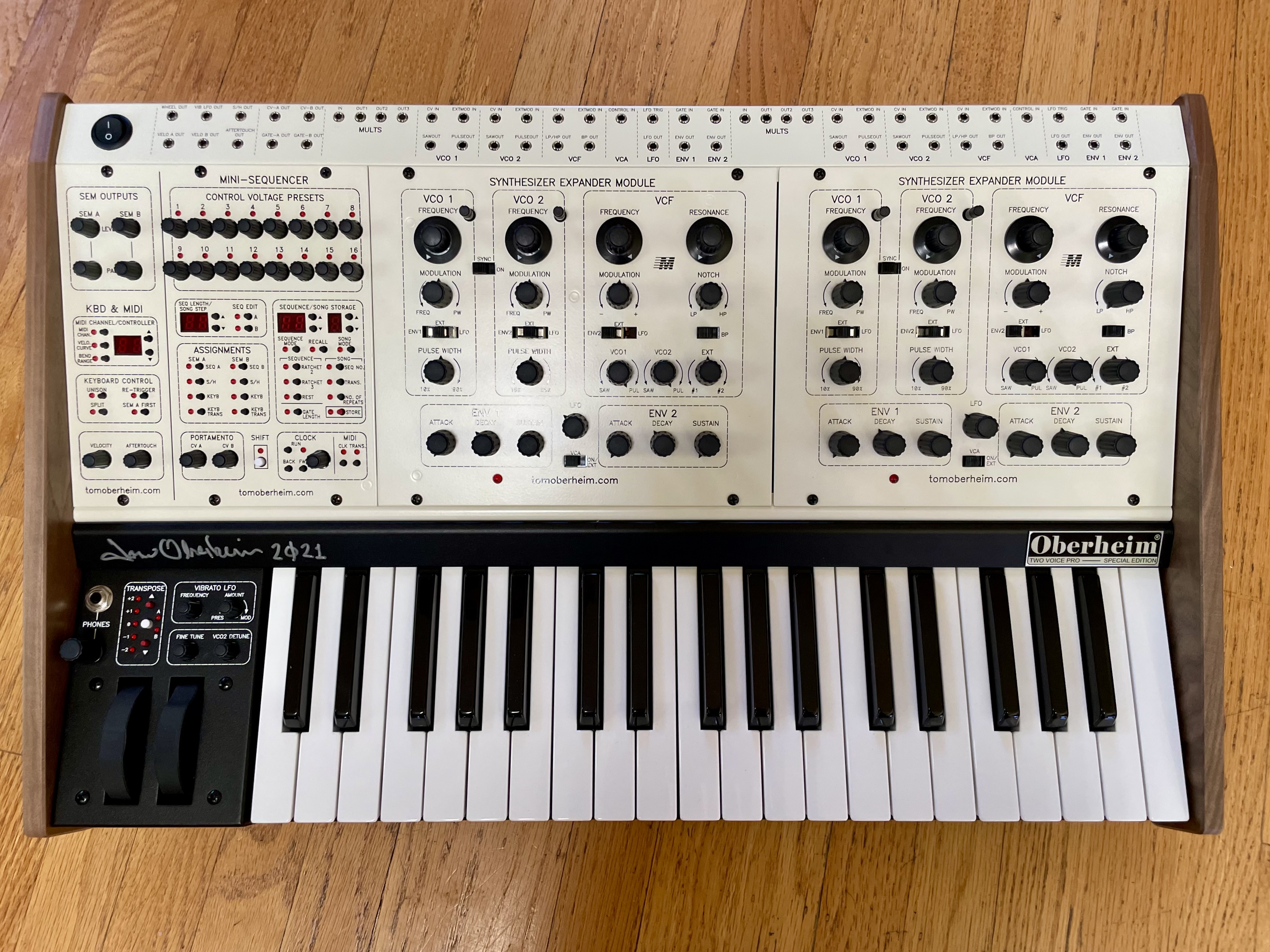
TVS Pro Special Edition

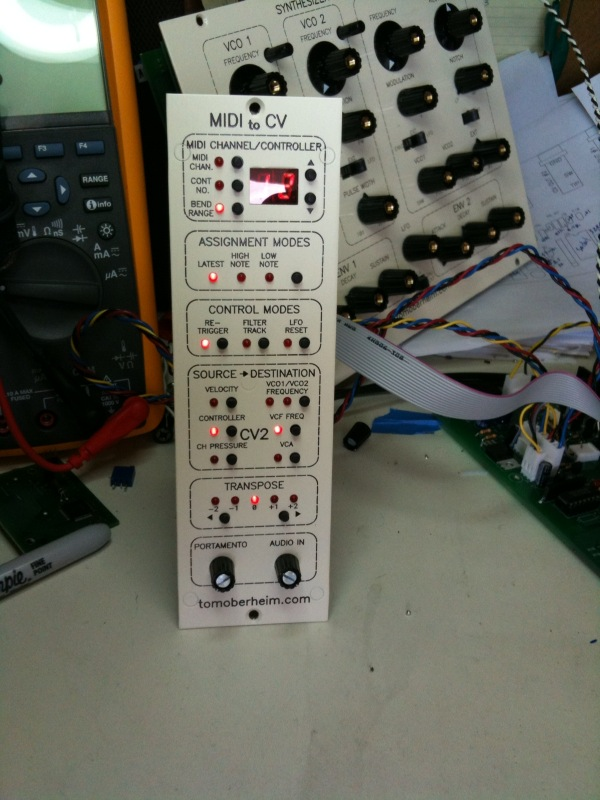
MIDI to CV panel for SEM

In 2009, Oberheim began hand-building and selling an updated SEM synthesizer with upgraded features, but with a true analog design as faithful to the sound of his original SEM as possible. In 2010, he announced plans to release the "Son of Four Voice," an updated version of his original Oberheim 4-Voice analog synthesizer.

In 2015, Oberheim announced the Two-Voice Pro, an upgraded and improved version of the instrument he described as his favorite of Oberheim's early years.

At the January 2016 NAMM Show, Oberheim announced the Dave Smith Instruments OB-6, a collaboration with Dave Smith which resulted in Oberheim's first voltage-controlled multi-voiced polyphonic synthesizer since the mid-1980s; Oberheim designed the VCO and VCF sections in the style of the company's SEM, while control features, arpeggiator/step sequencer and effects processing were designed by Smith based on the Prophet platform.

In 2019, Gibson announced the Oberheim Electronics name and other intellectual properties had been returned to Tom Oberheim. In 2021, Oberheim announced a manufacturing run of a limited quantity of Special Edition TVS Pro which would resemble the original TVS Pro, but would be the first Oberheim product to wear the "Oberheim®" brand since 1985. A limited number of buyers were chosen from a lottery, and the cost was announced as $4,995, plus tax and shipping.

In 2022, it was announced that Oberheim Electronics was re-opening and would be soon shipping a new Oberheim-branded synthesizer, called the Oberheim OB-X8, in May. The instrument was also co-developed with Sequential's Dave Smith, and was one of the last instruments to have that distinction before his death in 2022. In 2024, the TEO-5, an Oberheim-branded version of Sequential's Take 5 synthesizer with Oberheim filters, was also released. The instrument took its name from Oberheim's initials.

== Breakfast Club ==
Oberheim was a core member of an informal discussion group that met weekly in a Berkeley coffeehouse. The group's initial name, "The Dead Presidents Society", originated from the fact that most members were formerly presidents of companies that had gone out of business. Other notable innovators in technology and music who made up the group were Don Buchla, John Chowning, John Lazzaro, Ingrid Linn, Roger Linn, Max Mathews, Keith McMillen, Dave Smith, and David Wessel. The group shed the Dead Presidents name when it opened up to other members including professors from Stanford University and the University of California, Berkeley. Its new name is the Breakfast Club. With the coming of the COVID-19 pandemic, Breakfast Club meetings shifted to Zoom teleconferencing. This allowed for the introduction of other music technology innovators who are geographically removed from Berkeley.
