= Oberheim Two-Voice Pro =

Oberheim synthesizer reissue

Two-Voice
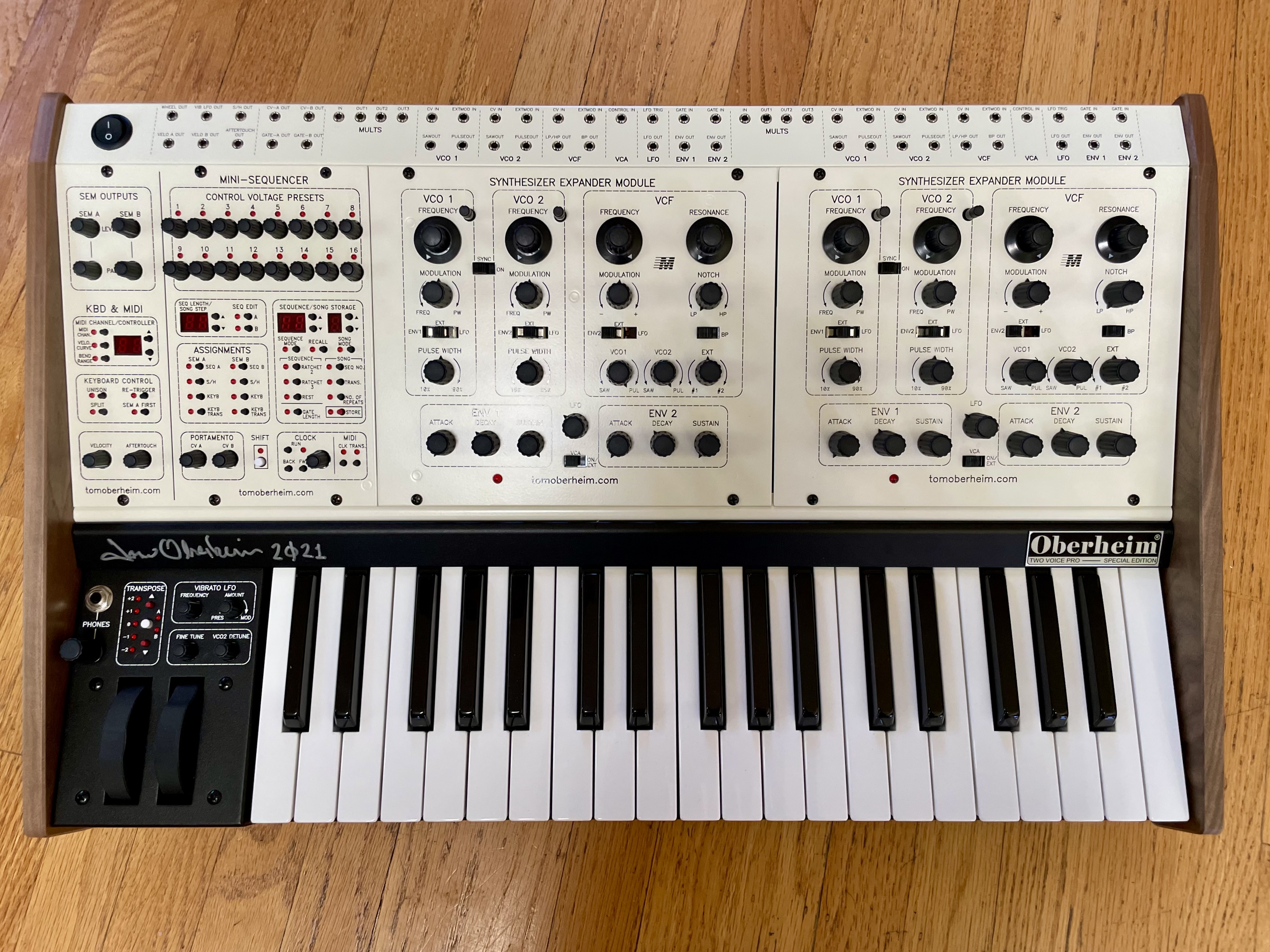
- Two-Voice Pro Special Edition
- Manufacturer: Oberheim
- Dates: 2015-2018, 2021
- Price: Original: $3495, Special Edition: $4995

Technical specifications
- Polyphony: 2 voices
- Oscillator: 4 VCOs (2 per voice) with sawtooth or variable-pulse waveforms
- LFO: 1 (triangle)
- Filter: 2 (multi-mode with cutoff and resonance)
- Attenuator: 2 (Attack, Decay and Sustain)

Input/output
- Keyboard: 37 keys
- External control: CV Gate / MIDI

The Oberheim Two-Voice Pro is an analog music synthesizer that was produced from 2015-2018 under the Tom Oberheim brand. It is an updated version of the original Oberheim Two-Voice, which was produced from 1975-1979.

This instrument was designed around coupling two SEM (Synthesizer Expander Module) modules. Each voice is individually programmed and has its own multi-mode filter. The modern Pro version contains a digital sequencer, MIDI, and a comprehensive patch panel to allow the instrument to interface with modular setups.

In March 2021, Tom Oberheim released a "Special Edition" version of the Two-Voice Pro in limited numbers. This was the first instrument designed by Tom Oberheim released under the Oberheim brand name since 1985; the Oberheim brand had been returned to him by Gibson in 2019.

== Notable users ==
- Vince Clarke
- Vangelis
- J3PO
- Kaitlyn Aurelia Smith

== See also ==
- Polyphonic synthesizer
