= Oberheim OB-Xa =

Polyphonic analogue synthesizer

OB-Xa
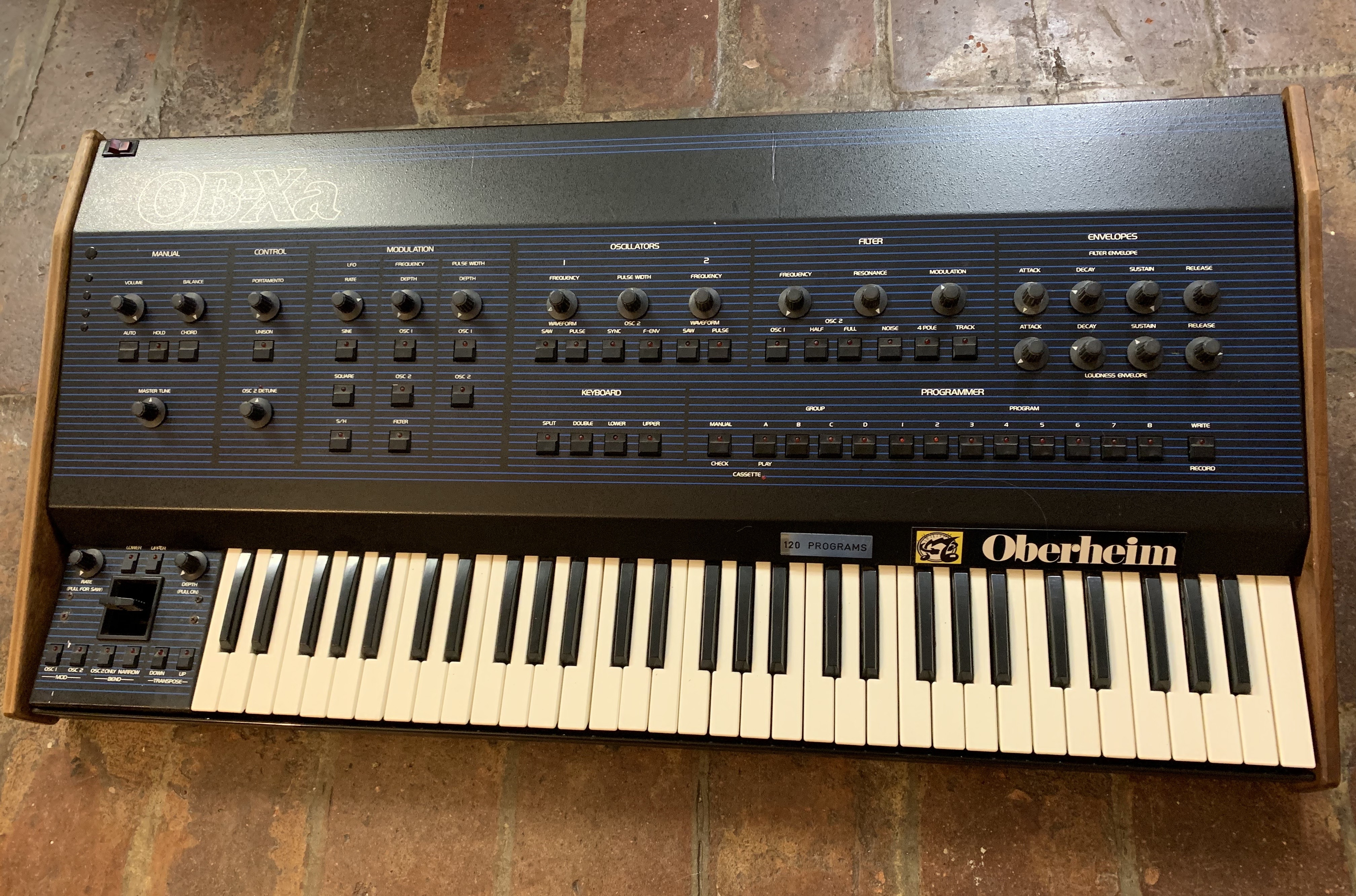
- Oberheim OB-Xa analog polyphonic synthesizer
- Manufacturer: Oberheim
- Dates: 1980 – 1983
- Price: US$4595 (4-voice); US$5595 (6-voice); US$6195 (8-voice)

Technical specifications
- Polyphony: 4, 6 or 8 voices
- Timbrality: Bi-timbral (keyboard split/layering)
- Oscillator: 2 VCOs per voice
- LFO: 1
- Synthesis type: Analog Subtractive
- Filter: Switchable 12dB/oct and 24dB/oct resonant low-pass
- Attenuator: 2 x ADSR; one for VCF, one for VCA
- Aftertouch expression: No
- Velocity expression: No
- Storage memory: 32 or 120 patches
- Effects: None

Input/output
- Keyboard: 61 keys
- Left-hand control: Pitch; Modulation
- External control: Oberheim system

The Oberheim OB-Xa was the second of Oberheim's OB-series polyphonic analog subtractive synthesizers, replacing the OB-X with updated features.

== History ==
The OB-Xa was released in December 1980, replacing the OB-X after only a year on the market. The OB-Xa was the first Oberheim product adorned with blue horizontal pinstripes on black background that would become standard trade dress for future Oberheim products. While the OB-Xa offered the same polyphony as its predecessor (4, 6 and 8-voice models were offered), its keyboard could be split into two halves (each with its own voice) or to layer voices to create thicker sound (essentially making two notes sound for every key pressed). The OB-Xa also added the ability to switch between 2-pole 12 dB and 4-pole 24 dB filtering. It offered Filter Envelope modulation for oscillator 2 (which allows the pitch to be modulated by the envelope) in place of the OB-X's ability to cross modulate (frequency modulation of the first VCO with the second VCO).

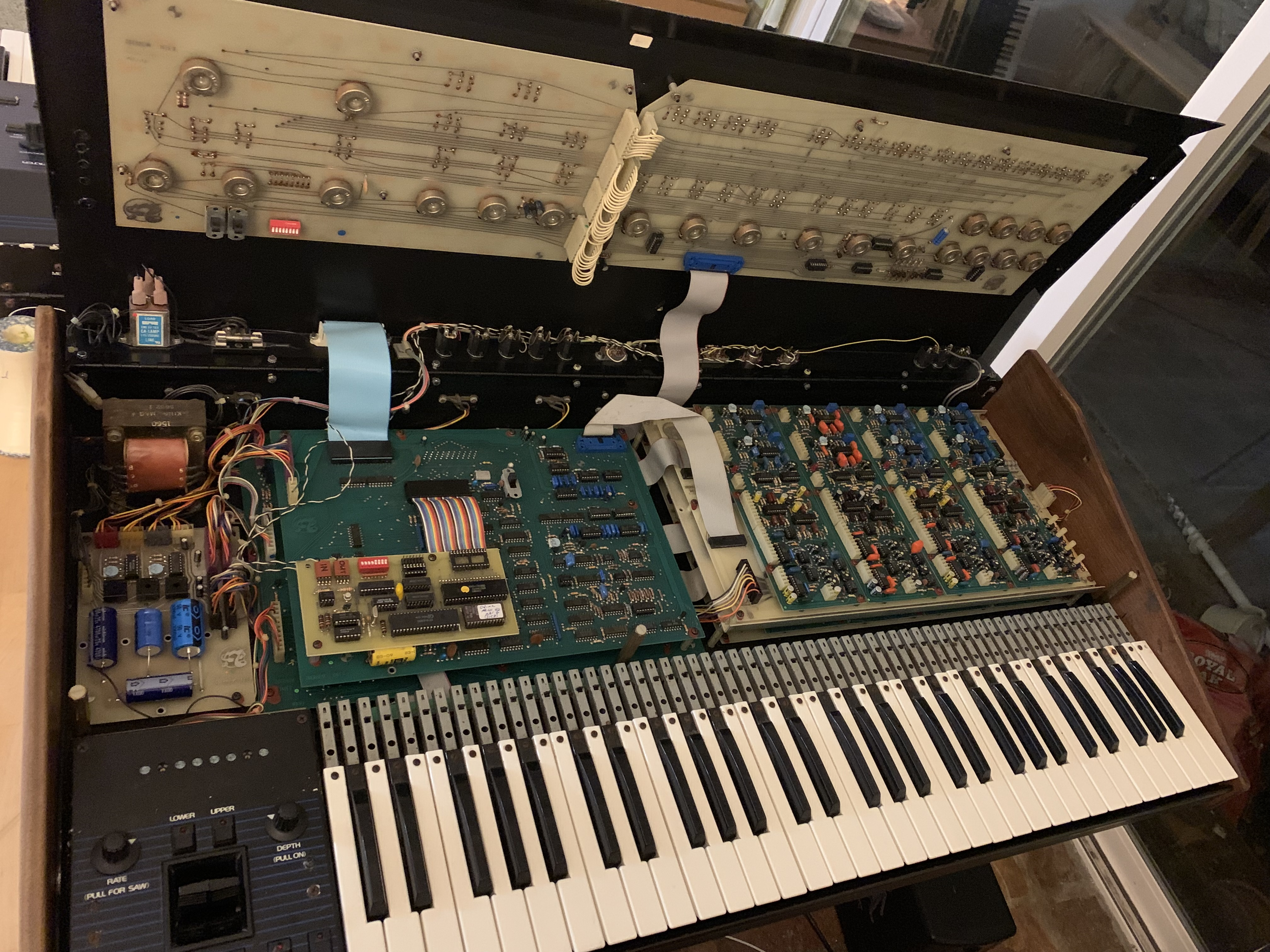
Interior view of Oberheim OB-Xa analog polyphonic synthesizer

Instead of the discrete circuits for oscillators and filters utilized by the OB-X, the OB-Xa (and the Oberheim synths to follow) switched to Curtis integrated circuits. This made the inside of the synth less cluttered, facilitating troubleshooting, and reducing the cost of manufacture. It was getting more difficult to service the OB-Xa due to the scarcity of Curtis chips; however, Curtis in June 2016, Coolaudio and Alfa all started re-manufacturing some of these chips which has breathed new life into the longevity of the OB-Xa and many other synthesizers that use these chips.

== Notable OB-Xa users ==
- The Carpenters
- Miles Davis
- Brad Fiedel
- Calvin Harris
- Billy Idol
- Jimmy Jam and Terry Lewis
- New Order
- Gary Numan
- The Police
- Prince
- Queen
- Cliff Richard
- Rush
- Simple Minds
- Rod Stewart
- The Stranglers
- Thompson Twins
- Van Halen (main part of their 1984 single "Jump")
- Robert J. Walsh

== Hardware re-issues and recreations ==
In 2017, Behringer announced it would replicate the CEM3340 VCO chips used in the OB-Xa synthesizer. The widow of chip creator Doug Curtis released a statement clarifying that the replica was made without permission and that Curtis "would be deeply saddened by the attempt of others to trade on his name and to make unsubstantiated claims of equivalency to his original inventions". In 2018, Uli Behringer announced that Behringer would be producing a clone of the OB-Xa known as the UB-Xa, but a microprocessor shortage delayed the project. The following year, however, Behringer announced that the UB-Xa was ready for manufacture, and announced a desktop version. The first UB-Xa units were delivered in December 2023.

In May 2022, the Oberheim OB-X8, a new 8-voice analog synthesizer with the voice architecture and filters of four classic Oberheim models: the OB-X, OB-SX, OB-Xa, and OB-8, along with functionality and features not included on the original models, was announced. The new synthesizer is manufactured by Sequential in partnership with Tom Oberheim.
