= Doug Curtis =

- Born: Douglas Curtis; March 8, 1951
- Died: January 10, 2007 (aged 55)
- Education: Northwestern University, Radio/Television/Film
- Spouse: Mary Curtis

Doug Curtis (March 8, 1951 – January 10, 2007) was the founder of Curtis Electromusic Specialties and OnChip Systems. Curtis was the designer of many original analogue ICs, used in a number of notable electronic music instruments. He was described in Keyboard as "one of the most important and least known synthesizer pioneers of the 20th century".

== Biography ==
While attending high school, Curtis combined his aptitude for physics and mathematics with an interest in music and synthesizers to design and build an analog synthesizer. He attended Northwestern University's School of Communications, where he majored in radio/television/film and built several other synthesizers. Upon graduation, he qualified for a post as junior engineer by showing circuit boards of his designs. He entered a competition to design a semi-custom chip and won, resulting in a job at Interdesign, where he worked for four years.

In 1979 he founded Curtis Electromusic Specialties (CEM), which produced the integrated circuits that were used in a variety of analog synthesizers for decades, beginning with projects for Oberheim Electronics and ARP, and later including Roland, Moog, Sequential Circuits and many others. Curtis' voltage-controlled filter, often referred to as a 'Curtis filter', is said to have that Curtis sound, described as "saturated, brash and powerful". He was awarded patents for several of his designs.

In 1988, Curtis established the company OnChip Systems in order to offer semi-custom chips for a broad range of applications and industries.

In 2006 Curtis was inducted into the San Jose Rocks Hall of Fame for technical contributions to music. He died in April 2007 from pancreatic cancer.
