= Oberheim Electronics =

American synthesizer company

- Industry: Electronic musical instruments
- Founded: 1969; 57 years ago in Los Angeles, California, United States
- Founder: Tom Oberheim
- Successor: Oberheim
- Headquarters: San Francisco, California, United States
- Products: Synthesizers, Sequencers, Signal processing, Drum machines
- Website: oberheim.com

Oberheim is an American synthesizer manufacturer founded in 1969 by Tom Oberheim. Beginning in 1975, Oberheim developed some of the first commercially available polyphonic synthesizers and was a prominent synthesizer and drum machine manufacturer through the mid-1980s. In 1988, the company changed ownership and was eventually purchased by Gibson Guitar Corporation, which developed new Oberheim products and licensed the trademark to other companies that produced Oberheim products, but development of Oberheim products ceased after 2000. In 2009, Tom Oberheim began developing instruments through his own company, and in 2019, Gibson returned the Oberheim trademark to Tom Oberheim, whose company rebranded as Oberheim.

== History and products ==
=== Beginnings and first polyphonic synthesizers ===
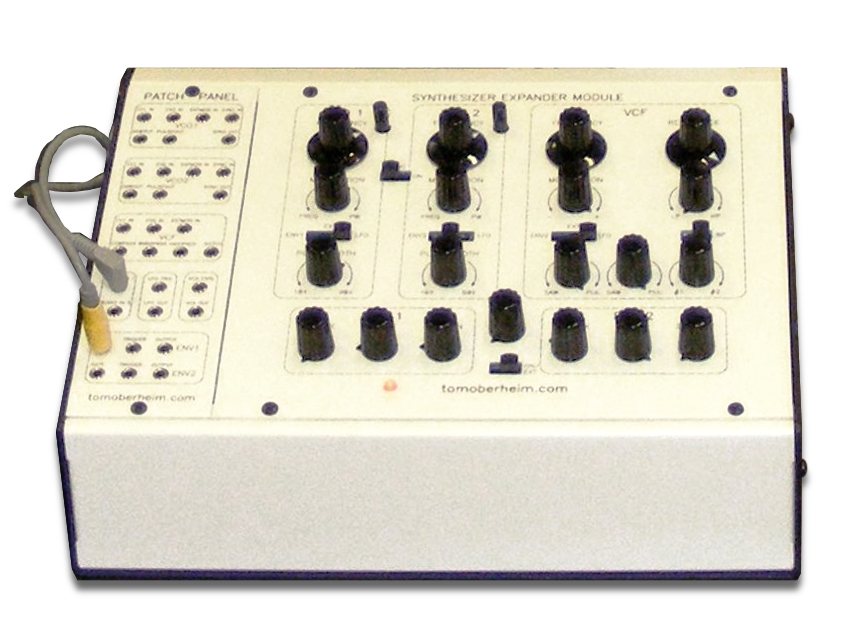
SEM (1974)

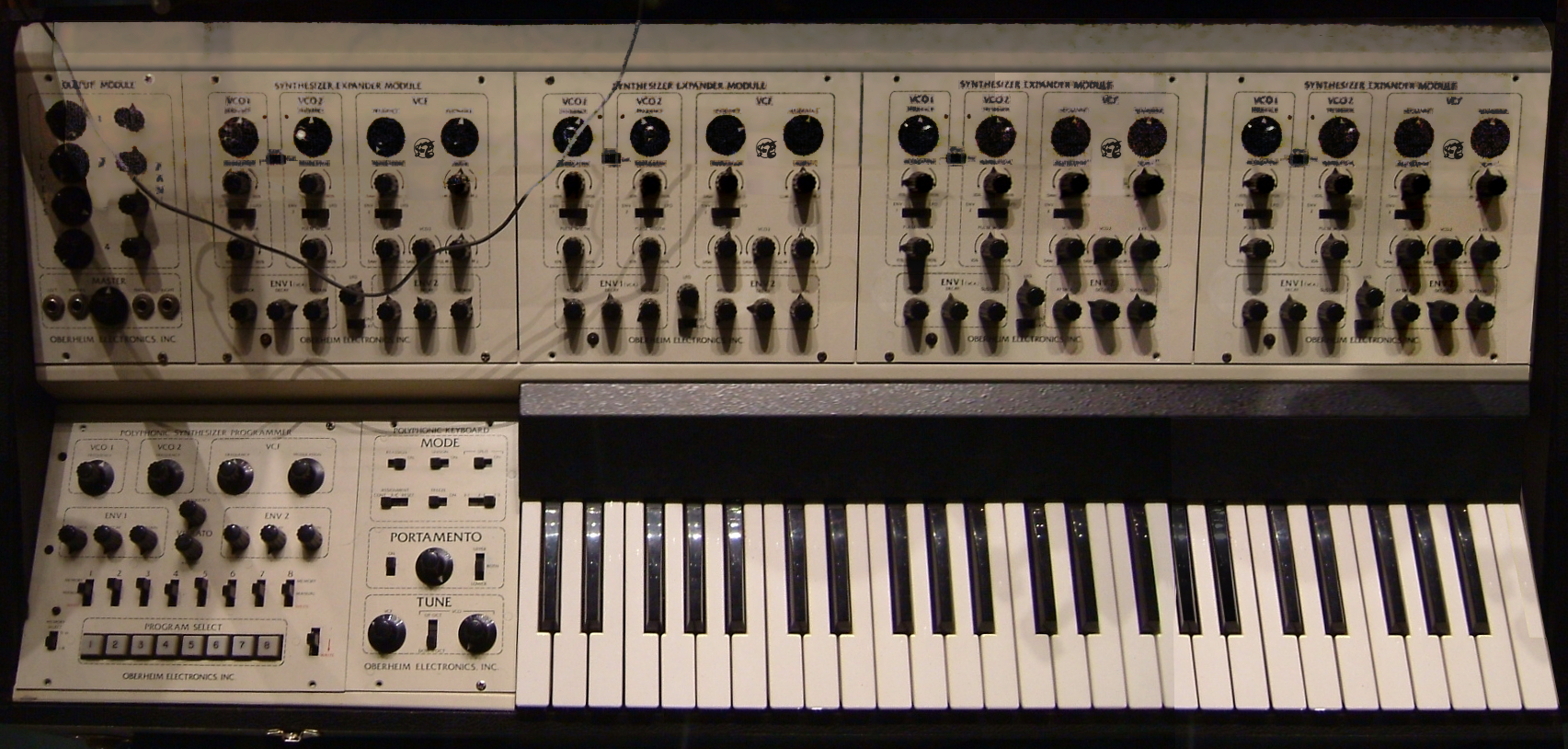
Four Voice (1975)

Tom Oberheim founded the company in 1969, originally as a designer and contract manufacturer of electronic effects devices for Chicago Musical Instruments under their Maestro brand, including the PS-1A Phase Shifter and RM-1 Ring Modulator, and briefly a retail dealer for ARP Instruments.

The company's first product released under its own name was the Oberheim DS-2, one of the first digital music sequencers. Recognizing that customers wanted to play one synthesizer while the DS-2 played a sequence on another, or layer the sound of one synthesizer with another, Oberheim introduced the Synthesizer Expander Module (SEM), a semi-modular analog synthesizer module, in 1974.

In late 1975, to replace lost sales after Chicago Musical Instruments successor Norlin canceled several large Maestro orders, Oberheim developed a series of polyphonic synthesizers by combining multiple SEM modules with a digitally scanned keyboard developed by Dave Rossum and a two-channel sequencer. The first of these was the Oberheim Two Voice, followed by the Four Voice and Eight Voice. These were among the first commercially available polyphonic synthesizers. Oberheim introduced the Two Voice and Four Voice at the June 1975 NAMM Show, the first time the company exhibited Oberheim-branded products. The following year, an optional Polyphonic Synthesizer Programmer module, capable of storing and recalling 16 instances of some SEM parameters, was made available for the Four Voice and Eight Voice.

Oberheim Polyphonic systems, with their distinctive signature cream-colored control panels, were used by such notable artists as Stevie Wonder, Lyle Mays of Pat Metheny Group, Herbie Hancock, Joe Zawinul of Weather Report, Jan Hammer, Geddy Lee of Rush.

=== OB-series and The System ===
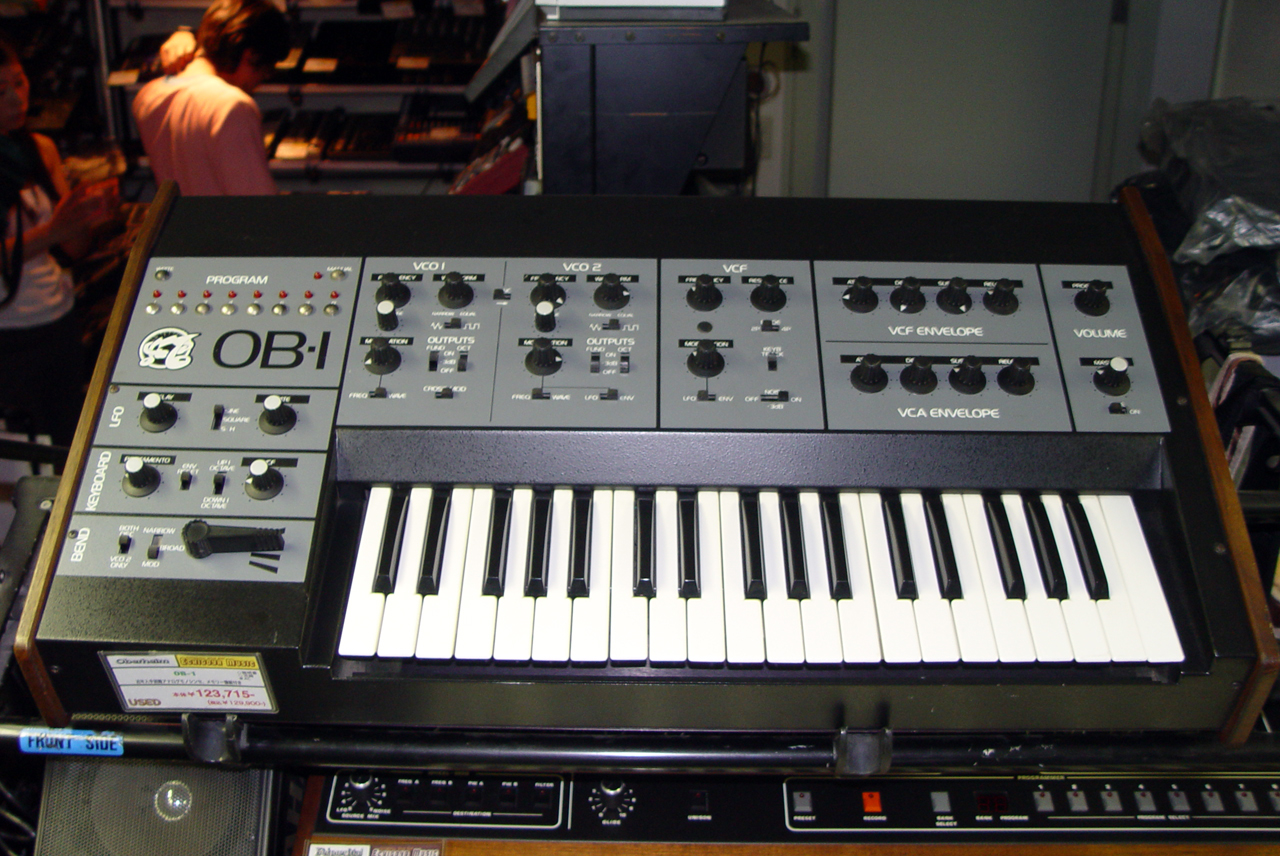
OB-1 (1977)

In 1977, building on the technology developed for the Polyphonic Synthesizer Programmer, Oberheim introduced the monophonic OB-1, the world's first completely programmable synthesizer. Following the introduction of the Sequential Circuits Prophet-5 in 1978, Oberheim developed polyphonic OB-series models, which replaced bulky independent SEMs with internal voice expansion cards which supported digital control of synthesis parameters, and also utilized common cabinetry and power supplies. The first of these was the OB-X, introduced in 1979, which was available in either 4-, 6-, or 8-voice configurations.

The OB-X was succeeded by the OB-Xa in 1980. The first Oberheim product adorned with the blue horizontal pinstripes on black background color scheme that would become the company's signature look, the OB-Xa streamlined manufacturing and troubleshooting by utilizing Curtis integrated circuits. It also featured the Oberheim Serial Buss, a pre-MIDI proprietary parallel bus for directly interfacing the OB-Xa with other Oberheim Serial Buss-equipped products, such as the DMX drum machine introduced in 1980, and the DSX digital sequencer introduced the following year. The combination of the DSX, DMX and the OB-Xa (or, later, OB-8) was marketed by Oberheim as "The System". In 1983, the eight-voice OB-8 was released; while aesthetically similar to the OB-Xa, it contained an additional set of front panel functions (dubbed "Page 2" by Oberheim), which effectively doubled the number of programming options it offered relative to its predecessors.

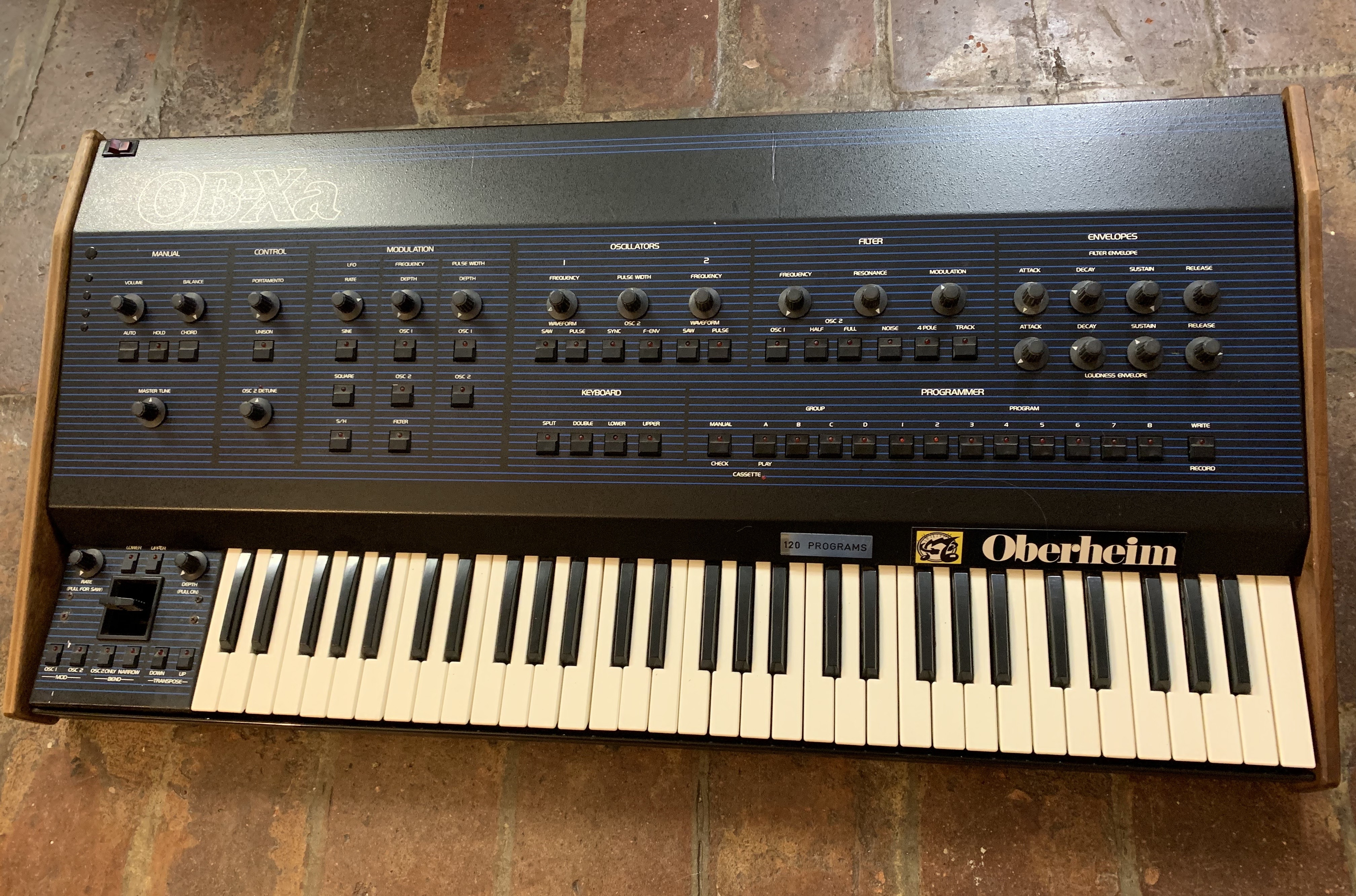
OB-Xa (1980)

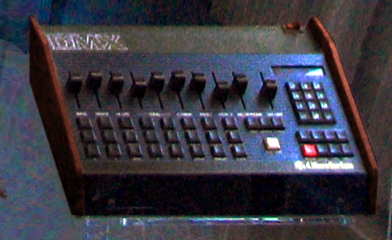
DMX (1980)

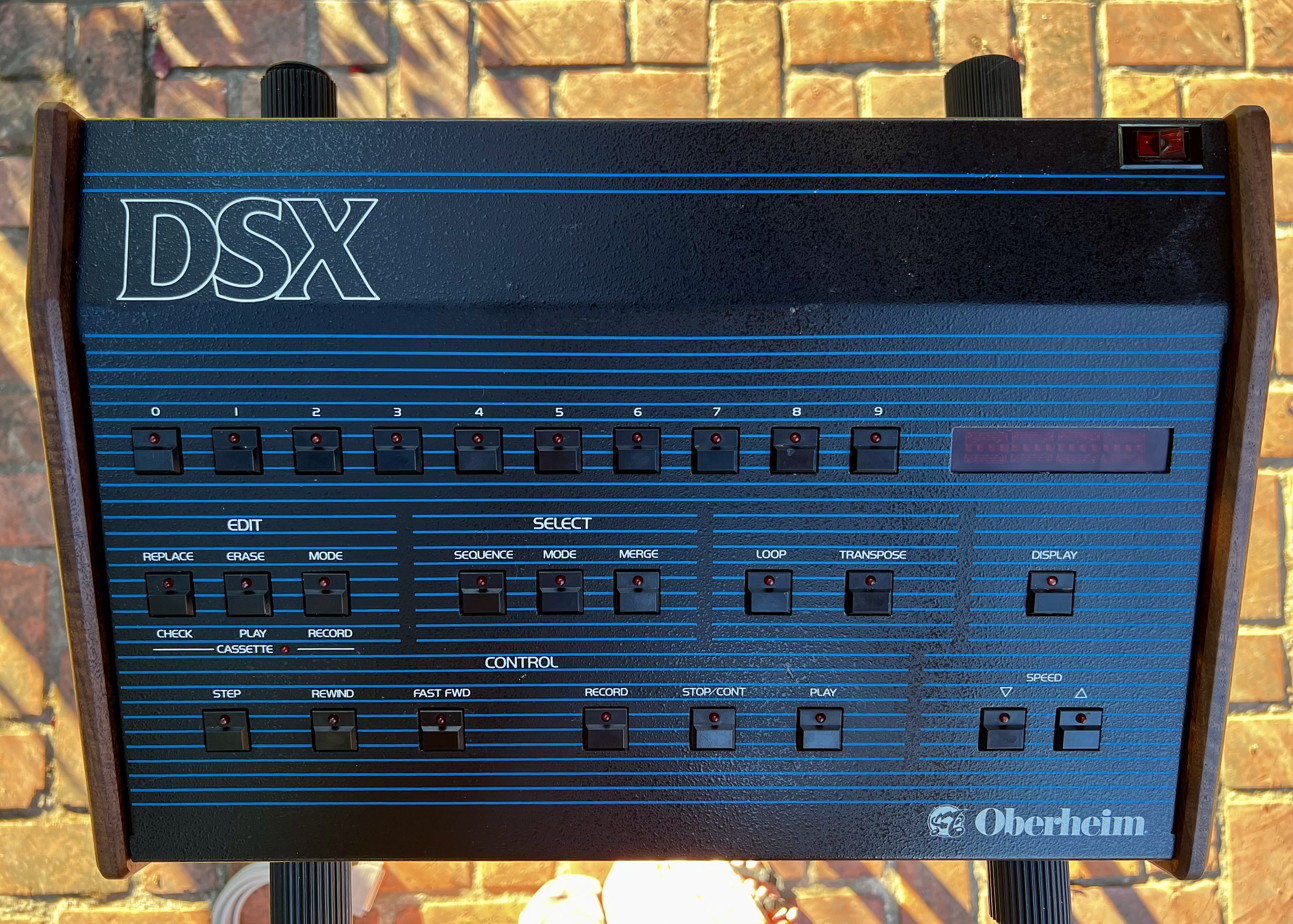
DSX (1981)

OB-series synthesizers and the DMX drum machine became a staple of 1980s new wave, synth-pop and hip hop music, heard on tracks such as Van Halen's "Jump", New Order's Blue Monday, Herbie Hancock's "Rockit", Madonna's "Into the Groove", Prince's "Let's Go Crazy", Phil Collins' "Sussudio", and Stevie Nicks' "Stand Back".

=== Bankruptcy and changes in ownership ===
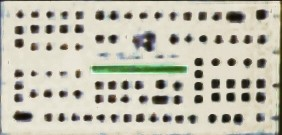
OB-Mx (1994)

Echoplex Digital Pro

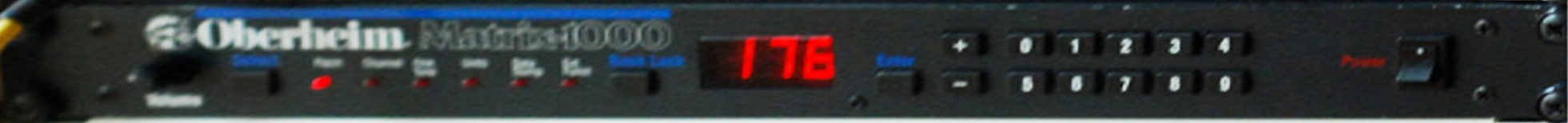
Matrix-1000 (1988)

Oberheim Electronics declared bankruptcy in 1985 and was acquired by a group of lawyers who changed the name to Oberheim ECC. Following the acquisition, Tom Oberheim was creatively still at the helm of the company for a couple of years, before leaving to found Marion Systems. During this time, Oberheim released several new products in its Matrix series of synthesizers, including the Matrix-12, Matrix-6 and the rack-mounted Xpander. The Matrix line would continue through 1987 with the release of the Matrix 1000, a rack-mounted module that feature limited onboard programming but contained a large number of presets.

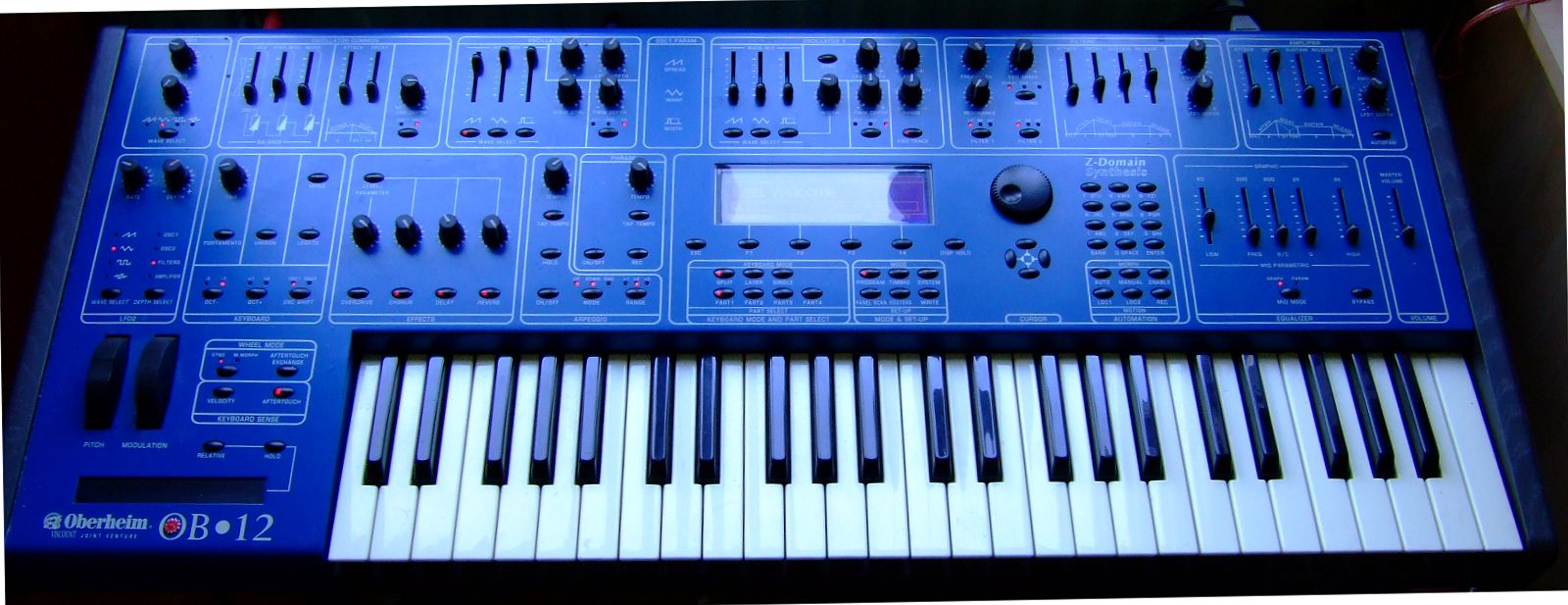
OB*12 (2000)

After a second bankruptcy in early 1988, Oberheim was acquired by Gibson Guitar Corporation. Under the direction of Keith McMillen, Oberheim produced the OB-Mx in collaboration with D.N. "Lynx" Crowe and Don Buchla; the Echoplex Digital Pro digital delay and looper in collaboration with Aurisis Research (released both as an Oberheim- and Gibson-branded product); and re-released the Oberheim Strummer and Matrix 1000.

In 2000, Gibson licensed the Oberheim trademark to Viscount International, an Italian manufacturer. Viscount developed the Oberheim OB*12 analog modeling synthesizer, the GM-1000 guitar multi-effects unit, the MC series of master keyboards, and the OB3^{2}, a virtual tonewheel organ.

=== Tom Oberheim returns to the synthesizer market ===
In 2009, Tom Oberheim announced that he was manufacturing a new version of the SEM. Even though no products had been manufactured under the Oberheim brand for years, the trademark was still owned by Gibson, so new SEMs were manufactured by Marion Systems Corporation, and branded with tomoberheim.com.

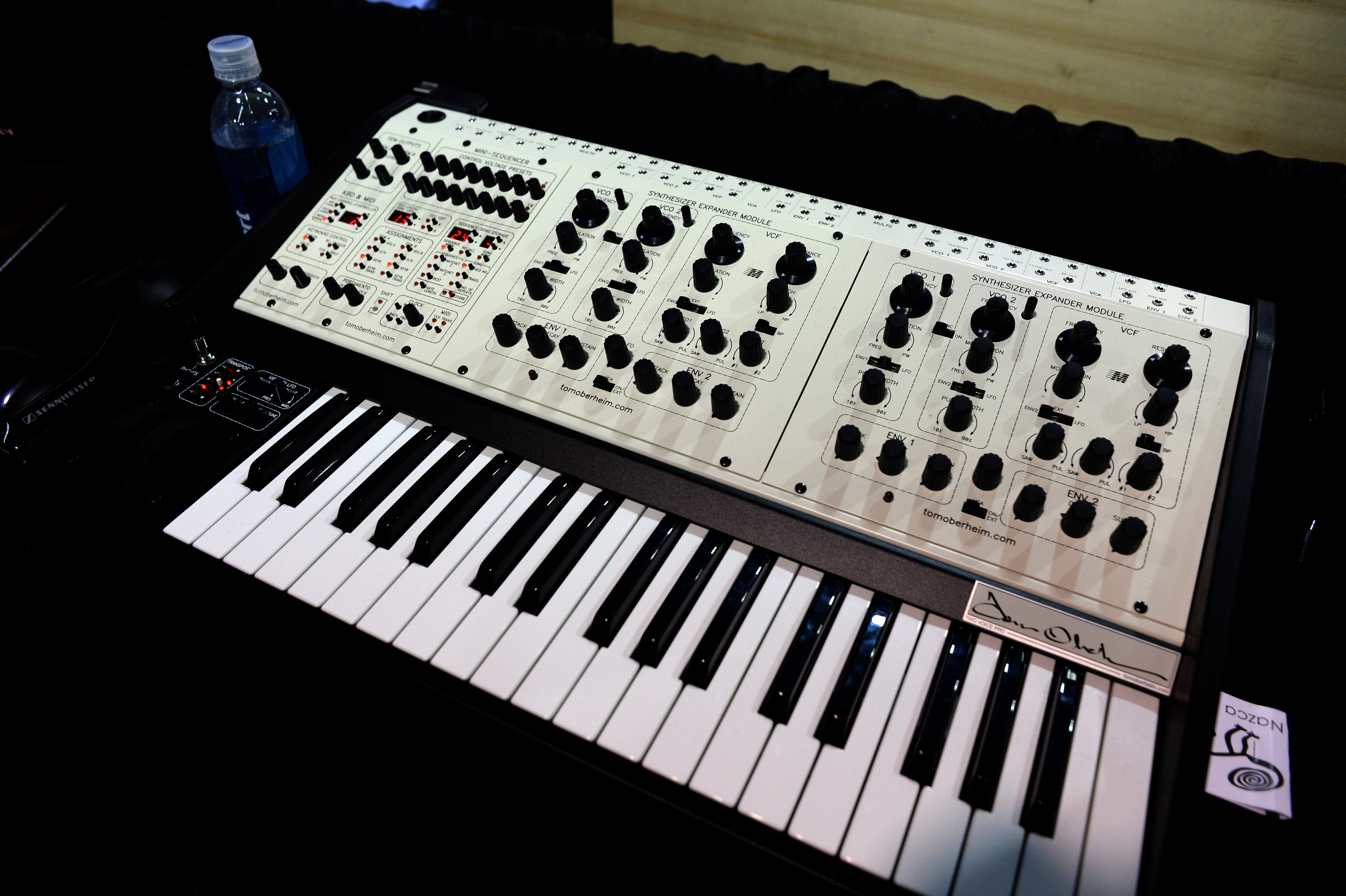
Two Voice Pro (2014)

In 2011, Tom Oberheim announced plans to design and manufacture a successor to the Four Voice to be named "Son Of 4 Voice" (SO4V), as well as an updated version of the classic Two Voice to be named Two Voice Pro. The Two Voice Pro, again manufactured by Marion Systems and branded tomoberheim.com, started shipping in 2014. The following year, Tom Oberheim said that he had indefinitely shelved plans for the SO4V.

At the January 2016 NAMM Show, Tom Oberheim and Dave Smith Instruments announced the OB-6, a collaboration with Dave Smith resulting in Tom Oberheim's first voltage-controlled multi-voiced polyphonic synth since the mid-1980s; Tom Oberheim designed the voice card with the circuits of the SEM's VCOs, VCFs, and VCAs, while control features, arpeggiator/step sequencer and effects processing were designed by Smith using his Prophet platform. The OB-6 was co-branded Tom Oberheim and Dave Smith Instruments.

=== Oberheim brand returns ===
In July 2019, Gibson CEO JC Curleigh returned the Oberheim trademark and IP to Tom Oberheim as "a gesture of goodwill to the musical instrument industry."

In May 2022, the Oberheim OB-X8 was released, the first Oberheim-branded synthesizer in decades. As with the OB-6, the OB-X8, which offers features from all of Oberheim Electronics' classic OB-series polysynths-the OB-X, OB-Xa, OB-SX, and OB-8-in a single unit, was designed and built in collaboration with Sequential. In 2024, Oberheim released the Oberheim TEO-5, a polysynth with an all-new design.

=== Legacy ===
Marcus Ryle and Michel Doidic both worked for Oberheim as instrument designers, and went on to develop several notable products for Alesis, including the ADAT multitrack digital tape recorder, before founding Line 6 together.

== See also ==
- Tom Oberheim
- E-mu Systems
- Gibson Guitar Corporation
- Viscount
