= Oberheim DMX =

Drum machine

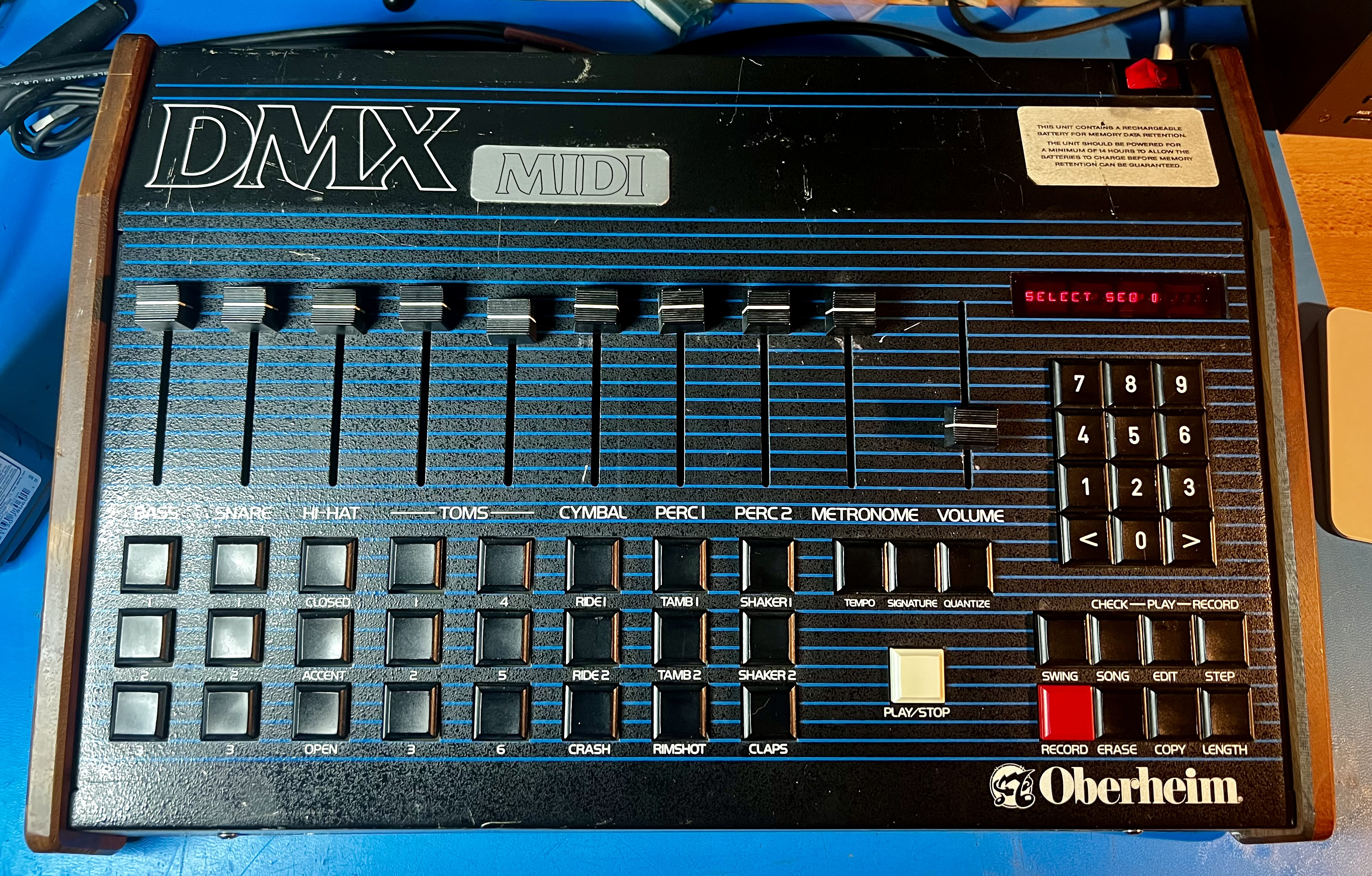
Oberheim DMX

The DMX is a programmable digital drum machine manufactured by Oberheim. It was introduced in 1980 at a list price of US$2,895 (equivalent to $11,300 in 2025) and remained in the company's product line until the mid-1980s.

The Oberheim DMX was the second digital drum machine ever to be sold as a commercial product, following the Linn LM-1 Drum Computer in 1980. Its popularity among musicians of the era contributed to the sound and evolution of 1980s new wave, synth-pop and hip-hop music.

== Background ==
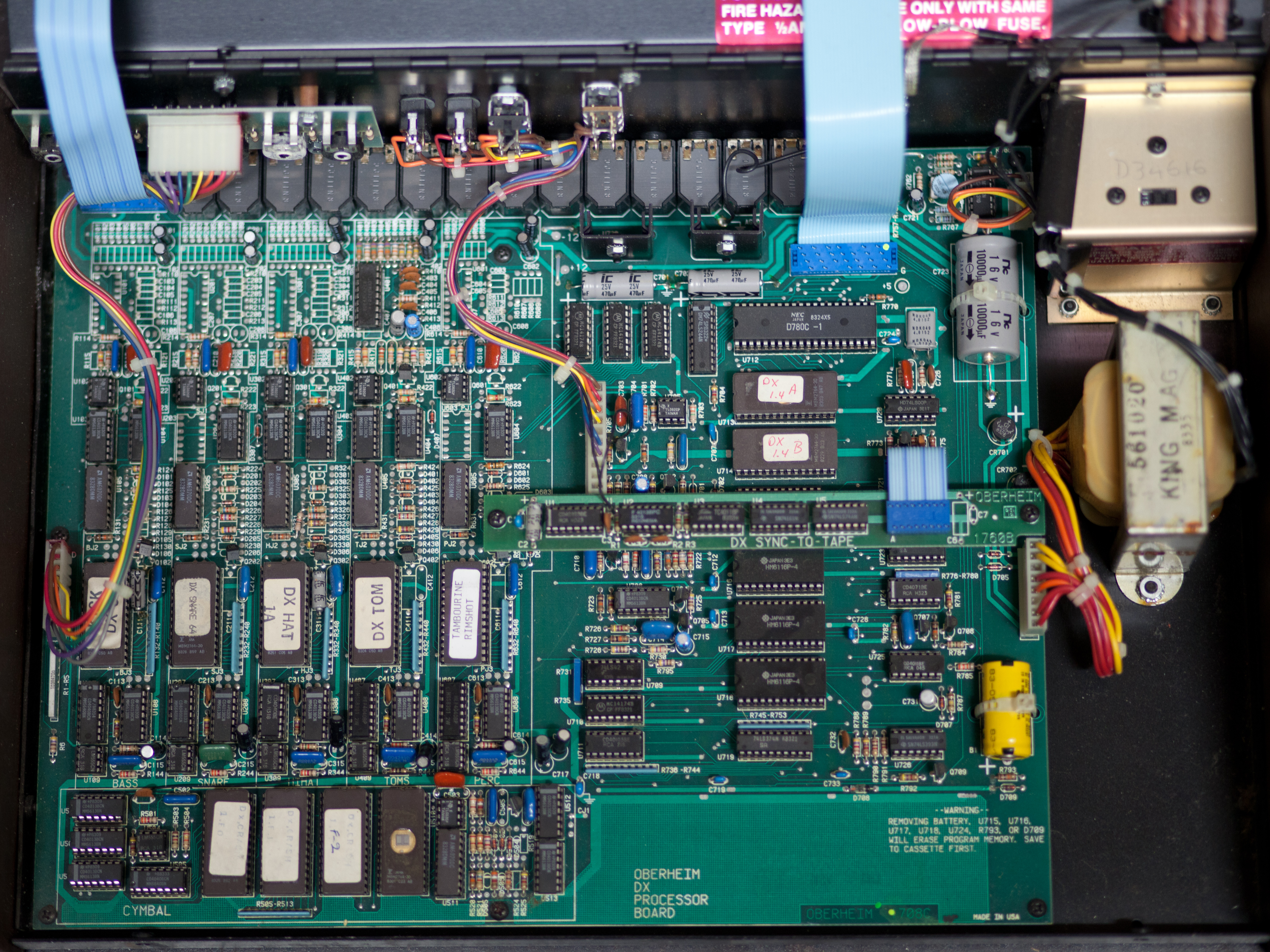
Oberheim DX processor board, showing the EPROM chips containing samples

Immediately following the success of the Linn LM-1, other manufacturers began to develop and release drum machines intended to compete with the LM-1's ease of programmability and realistic sound quality. The DMX featured sampled sounds of real drums, as well as individual tuning controls for each drum voice and a swing function. In addition, it boasted several humanizing elements such as rolls, flams, and timing variations that were meant to mimic those of real drummers.

The DMX features 24 individual drum sounds derived from 11 original samples and allows for a maximum 8-voice polyphony; one voice per card. It also featured eight separate outputs for individual processing, and allowed up to 100 sequences and 50 songs. One of the distinguishing features of the DMX is that it allowed integration with Oberheim's proprietary interfacing system (the Oberheim Parallel Buss) that pre-dated MIDI and allowed Oberheim equipment to be synchronized with the machine. Later models included factory-fitted MIDI ports and third-party companies also manufactured MIDI interfaces for the DMX.

Drum and percussion samples are stored in EPROM chips placed on removable voice cards. The data format is 8-bit PCM using μ-law companding, increasing sound resolution to approximately 12 bits in the analog domain (a design technique also employed by other early drum machines, including products by Linn Electronics, E-mu Systems and Sequential Circuits).

The DMX's punchy and realistic drum sound made it attractive to many artists and producers involved in the fledgling hip-hop scene, and it is featured on many of the genre's early landmark recordings. It is in continuous use in dancehall reggae music. Artists that have used the DMX include New Order on its 1983 single "Blue Monday" and The Police on "Every Breath You Take" (kick drum only). Several artists derived their names from the drum computer, including DMX Krew, Davy DMX, and DMX.

== Oberheim DX ==
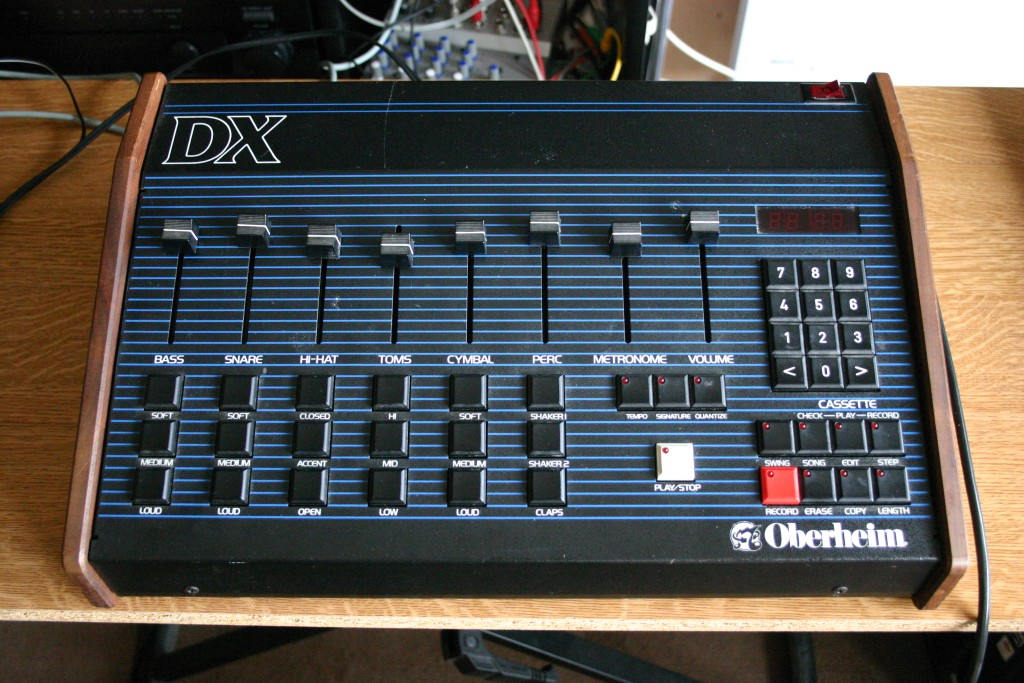
Oberheim DX

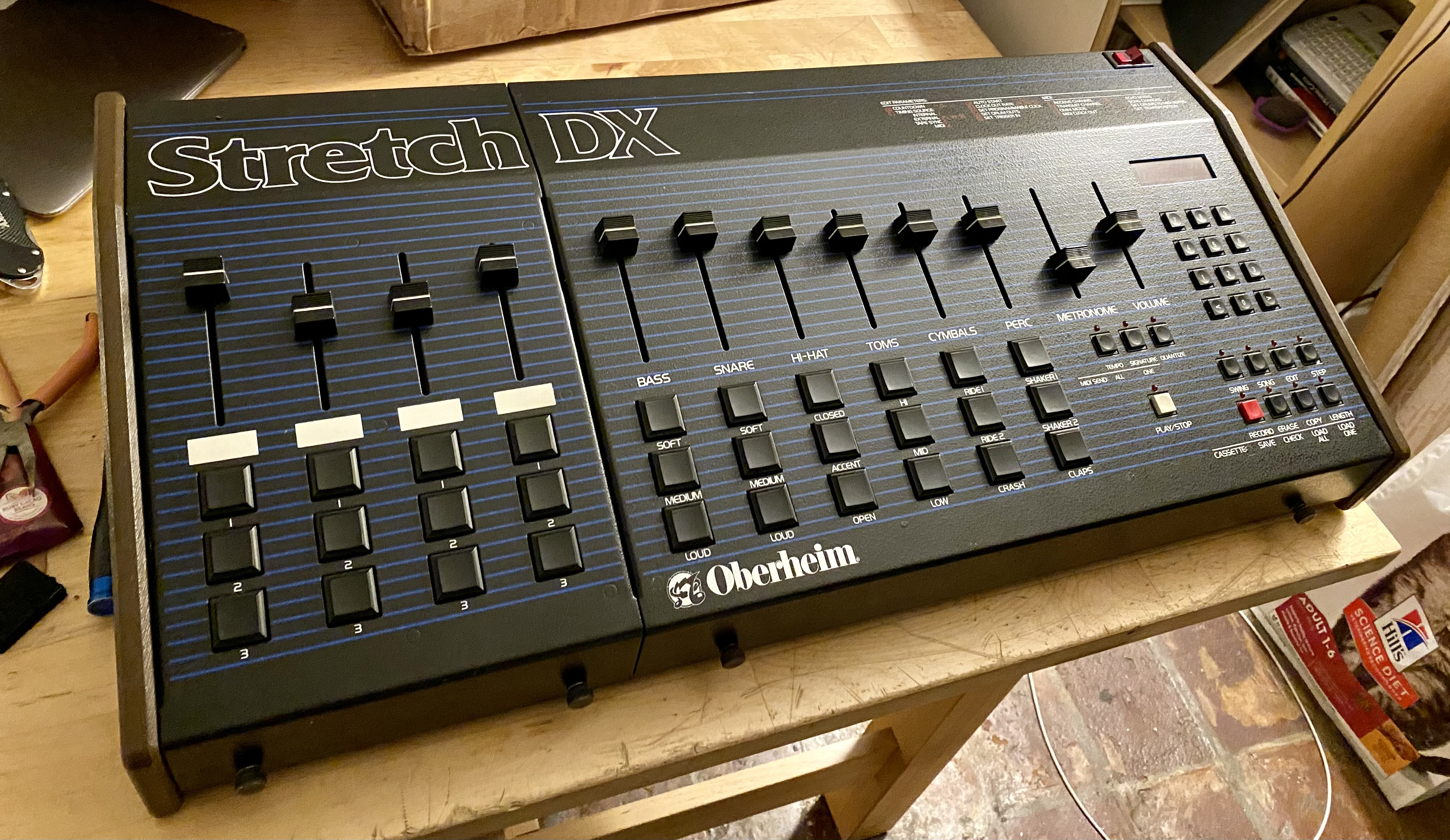
Oberheim "Stretch" DX

Introduced in 1983, the Oberheim DX was a slightly stripped-down version of the DMX, available at a list price of US$1,395. The look and feel of the machine was similar to that of the DMX, but it only featured 18 sounds instead of 24; allowed for 6-sound polyphony instead of 8; had a 4-digit, 7-segment display instead of a 16-character alphanumeric display; and had fake plastic wood instead of walnut. Fortunately, DX maintained the DMX feature of use of removable/replaceable voice cards on EPROMs. The DXa model added MIDI support from the factory. Like the DMX, the DX was popular among early hip hop artists. It was also extensively used in dancehall reggae.

The DX was later extended with an optional bolt-on "Stretch" expansion, which added four new voices plus some additional features.
