= CV/gate =

Analogue method of electronic sound control

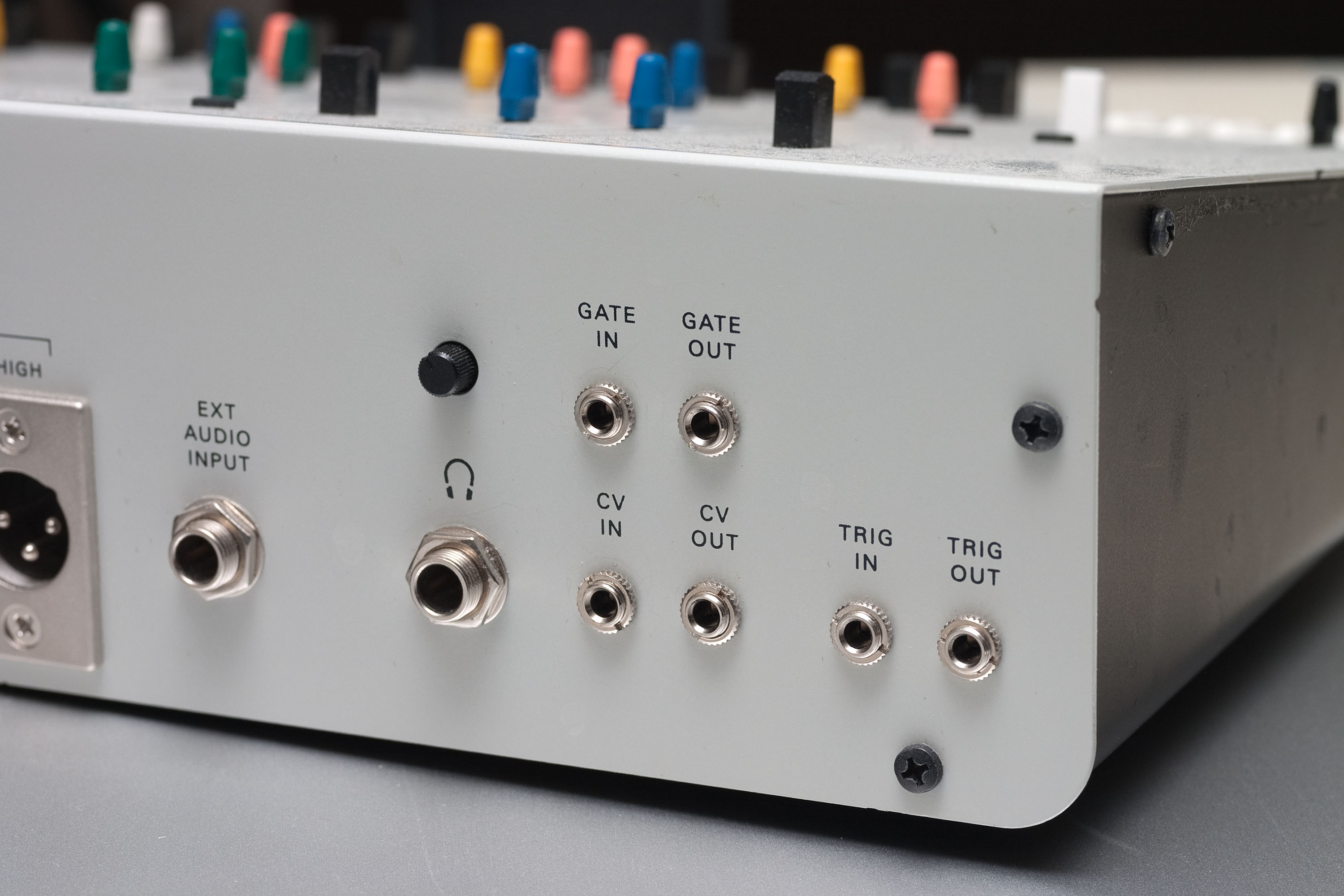
The CV/gate interfaces of a Korg ARP analogue synthesizer

CV/gate (an abbreviation of control voltage/gate) is an analog method of controlling synthesizers, drum machines, and similar equipment with external sequencers. The control voltage typically controls pitch and the gate signal controls note on-off.

This method was widely used in the epoch of analog modular synthesizers and CV/Gate music sequencers, since the introduction of the Roland MC-8 Microcomposer in 1977 through to the 1980s, when it was eventually superseded by the MIDI protocol (introduced in 1983), which is more feature-rich, easier to configure reliably, and more readily supports polyphony. The advent of digital synthesizers also made it possible to store and retrieve voice "patches", eliminating patch cables and (for the most part) control voltages. However, numerous companies — including Doepfer, who designed a modular system for Kraftwerk in 1992, Buchla, MOTM, Analogue Systems, and others — continue to manufacture modular synthesizers that are increasingly popular and rely primarily on analog CV/gate signals for communication. Additionally, some recent non-modular synthesizers (such as the Alesis Andromeda) and many effects devices (including the Moogerfooger pedals by Moog as well as many guitar oriented devices) include CV/gate connectivity. Many modern studios use a hybrid of MIDI and CV/gate to allow synchronization of older and newer equipment.

== Basic usage ==
In modular synthesizers, each synthesizer component (e.g., low frequency oscillation (LFO), voltage-controlled filter (VCF), etc.) can be connected to another component by means of a patch cable which transmits voltage. Changes in the voltage cause changes to one or more parameters of the component and frequently involved a keyboard transmitting two types of data (CV and gate), or control modules such as LFOs and envelope generators transmitting CV data:

- Control voltage (CV) indicates which note (event) to play: a different voltage for each key pressed. Those voltages are typically connected to one or more oscillators, thus producing the different pitches required. Such a method implies that the synthesizer is monophonic. CV can also control parameters such as rate, depth and duration of a control module.
- Trigger indicates when a note should start, a pulse that is used to trigger an event, typically an ADSR envelope. In the case of triggering a drum machine, a clock signal or LFO square wave could be employed to signal the next beat. The trigger can be a specific part of an electronic pulse, such as the rising slope of an electronic signal.
- Gate is related to a trigger, but sustains the signal throughout the event. It turns on when the signal goes high, and turns off when the signal goes low.

=== CV ===
The concept of CV is fairly standard on analog synthesizers, but not its implementation. For pitch control via CV, there are two prominent implementations:

- Volts per octave was popularized by Bob Moog in the 1960s, and was widely adopted for control interfacing. One volt represents one octave, so the pitch produced by a voltage of 3 V is one octave lower than that produced by a voltage of 4 V. Each 1 V octave can be divided linearly into 12 semi-tones. Companies using this CV method included Roland, Moog, Sequential Circuits, Oberheim, ARP and the Eurorack standard from Doepfer, including more than 7000 modules from at least 316 manufacturers. This convention typically had control modules carry the source voltage (B+, 5 V) on the ring of a TRS jack, with the processed voltage returning on the tip. However, other manufacturers have used different implementations with voltages including –5 V to 5 V, 0 V to 5 V, 0 V to 10 V with the B+ possibly on the tip. This makes interoperability of modules problematic.
- Hertz per volt, used by most but not all Korg and Yamaha synthesizers, represents an octave of pitch by doubling voltage, so the pitch represented by 2 V is one octave lower than that represented by 4 V, and one higher than that represented by 1 V.

The table compares notes and corresponding voltage levels in both implementations (this example uses 1 V per octave and 55 Hz/V):

Implementation / Note	A1	A2	A3	B3	C4	D4	E4	A4	A5
Volts/octave (V)	1.000	2.000	3.000	3.167	3.250	3.417	3.583	4.000	5.000
Hertz/volt (V)	1.000	2.000	4.000	4.490	4.757	5.339	5.993	8.000	16.000

The voltages are linked by the formula $V_{hz} = 2^{V_{oct}-1}$, which can also be written $V_{oct} = ln_2(V_{hz}) + 1$. These two implementations are not critically incompatible: voltage levels used are comparable and there are no other safety concerns. So, for example, connecting a Hz/volt keyboard to a volts/octave synthesizer will likely produce some sound, but it will be completely out of tune. At least one commercial interface has been created to solve the problem, the Korg MS-02 CV/trigger interface. On synthesizers the CV signal may be labelled "CV", "VCO in", "keyboard in", "OSC" or "keyboard voltage".

CV control of parameters other than pitch usually follows the same pattern of minimum to maximum voltage. For example, Moog modular synthesizers use the 0 V to 5 V control voltage for all other parameters. They are represented on the front panel of many synthesizers as knobs, but often a patch bay allows the input or output of the related CV to synchronize multiple modules together. The pitch voltage from a keyboard could also be used to control the rate of an LFO, which could be applied to the volume of the oscillator output, creating a tremolo that becomes faster as the pitch rises. Modules that can be controlled by CV include VCF, VCA, high and low frequency oscillators, ring modulators, sample and hold circuits and noise injection.

=== Trigger ===
Trigger also has two implementations:

- V-trigger, "voltage trigger", or "positive trigger" normally holds voltage low (around 0 V) and at trigger produces a fixed positive voltage to switch a note on. The trigger voltage level differs among brands, from 2 V to 10 V. V-trigger is used by Roland and Sequential Circuits synthesizers, among others.
- S-trigger, "short circuit trigger", or "negative trigger" normally holds voltage high, shorting the trigger to ground when the note should play. S-trigger was used in the early Moog Modular systems, however it is rarely used today. This is not to be confused with the inverted gate signals used in Korg and Yamaha synthesizers.

Depending on the voltage level, connecting an incompatible triggering system will either yield no sound at all or reverse all keypress events (i.e. sound will be produced with no keys pressed and muted on keypress). On older equipment, the gate/trigger signal may be labelled "gate", "trig" or "S-trig".

=== Gate ===
- Like a trigger, gate signal voltage may vary among brands. In some implementations, gate signals may even dip into negative voltage ranges. Gate inputs are typically isolated, or "buffered" to prevent damage to some equipment that cannot handle excessive or negative voltages.

== Modern usage ==
Since the publishing of the MIDI standard in 1983, usage of CV/gate to control synthesizers has decreased dramatically. The most criticized aspect of the CV/gate interface is the allowance of only a single note to sound at a single moment of time. Shortly after the MIDI standard came out Roland introduced the Roland MPU-101, a MIDI to CV/gate converter that takes an input from four MIDI channels; i.e. a variable base MIDI channel plus the next three consecutive MIDI channels and converted up to four MIDI channels into four separate CV/gate outputs able to control four separate CV/gate synthesizers or a four-voice synthesizer like the Oberheim Four Voice analog synthesizer which is made up of four separate monophonic SEM modules.

However, the 1990s saw renewed interest in analog synthesizers and various other equipment. In order to facilitate synchronization between these older instruments and newer MIDI-enabled equipment, some companies produced several models of CV/gate-MIDI interfaces. Some models target controlling a single type of synthesizer and have fixed CV and gate implementation, while some models are more customizable and include methods to switch used implementation. CV/gate is also very easy to implement and it remains an easier alternative for homemade and modern modular synthesizers. Also, various equipment, such as stage lighting, sometimes uses a CV/gate interface. For example, a strobe light can be controlled using CV to set light intensity or color and gate to turn an effect on and off. With the resurgence of non-modular analog synthesizers, the exposure of synthesizer parameters via CV/gate provided a way to achieve some of the flexibility of modular synthesizers. Some synthesizers could also generate CV/gate signals and be used to control other synthesizers.

One of the main advantages of CV/gate over MIDI is in the resolution. The fundamental MIDI control message uses seven bits or 128 possible steps for resolution. Thirty two controls per channel allow MSB (Most Significant Byte) and LSB (Least Significant Byte) together to specify 14 bits or 16,384 possible steps of total resolution. Control voltage is analog and by extension infinitely variable. There is less likelihood of hearing the zipper effect or noticeable steps in resolution over large parameter sweeps. Human hearing is especially sensitive to pitch changes, and for this reason MIDI pitch bend uses 14 bits fundamentally. Beyond the 512 directly defined 14-bit controls, MIDI also defines tens of thousands of 14-bit RPNs (Registered Parameter Number) and NRPNs (Non-Registered Parameter Number), but there is no method described for going beyond 14 bits.

A major difference between CV/gate and MIDI is that in many analog synthesizers no distinction is made between voltages that represent control and voltages that represent audio. This means that audio signals can be used to modify control voltages and vice versa. In MIDI they are completely separate however, and additional software such as Expert Sleepers is required to convert analog CV signals into numerical MIDI control data. Some software synthesizers emulate control voltages to allow their virtual modules to be controlled as early analog synthesizers were. For example, Reason allows myriad connection possibilities with CV, and allows gate signals to have a "level" rather than a simple on-off (for example, to trigger not just a note, but the velocity of that note). In 2009, Mark of the Unicorn (MOTU) released a virtual instrument plug-in, Volta, allowing Mac-based audio workstations with Audio Units support to control some hardware devices. CV control is based on the audio interface line level outputs, and as such only supports a limited number of synthesizers.

In recent years, many guitar effects processors have been designed with CV input. Implementations vary widely and are not compatible with one another so it is critical to understand how a manufacturer is producing the CV before attempting to use multiple processors in a system. Moog facilitated the CV by producing two interfaces designed to receive and transmit CV in a system, the MP-201 (which includes MIDI) and the CP-251. Examples of effects allowing the use of CV include delays (Electroharmonix DMB and DMTT, Toneczar Echoczar, Line6, Strymon and others), tremolo (Goatkeeper), Flange (Foxrox Paradox), envelope generators/lowpass filters/ring modulators (Big Briar, WMD) and distortion (WMD).

== See also ==
- DCB
- DIN sync
- Open Sound Control
