= Voltage-controlled filter =

Electronic filter circuit controlled with voltage

A voltage-controlled filter (VCF) is an electronic filter whose operating characteristics (primarily cutoff frequency) can be set by an input control voltage. Voltage-controlled filters are widely used in synthesizers.

Depiction of cutoff frequency of a low-pass filter, showing Butterworth response

A music synthesizer VCF allows its cutoff frequency, and sometimes its Q factor (resonance at the cutoff frequency), to be continuously varied. The filter outputs often include a lowpass response, and sometimes highpass, bandpass or notch responses. Some musical VCFs offer a variable slope which determines the rate of attenuation outside the bandpass, often at 6 dB/octave, 12 dB/octave, 18 dB/octave or 24 dB/octave (one-, two-, three- and four-pole filters, respectively). In modular analog synthesizers, VCFs receive signal input from signal sources, including oscillators and noise, or the output of other processors. By varying the cutoff frequency, the filter passes or attenuates partials of the input signal.

In some popular electronic music styles, "filter sweeps" have become a common effect. These sweeps are created by varying the cutoff frequency of the VCF (sometimes very slowly). Controlling the cutoff by means of a transient voltage control, such as an envelope generator, especially with relatively fast attack settings, may simulate the attack transients of natural or acoustic instruments.

Historically, musical VCFs have included variable feedback which creates a response peak (Q) at the cutoff frequency. This peak can be quite prominent, and when the filter's frequency is swept by a control, partials present in the input signal resonate. Some filters are designed to provide enough feedback to go into self-oscillation, and it can serve as a sine-wave source.

ARP Instruments made a multifunction voltage-controlled filter module capable of stable operation at a Q over 100; it could be shock-excited to ring like a vibraphone bar. Q was voltage-controllable, in part by a panel-mounted control. Its internal circuit was a classic analog computer state variable "loop", which provided outputs in quadrature.

A VCF is an example of an active non-linear filter. The characteristic musical sound of a particular VCF depends on both its linear (small-signal) frequency response and its non-linear response to larger amplitude inputs.

== Synthesizer filter types ==
- Transistor ladder filter
- Diode ladder filter
- Sallen–Key filter
- OTA filter

== See also ==
- Audio filter
- Electronic filter
- Electronic filter topology
- Non-linear filter
- Self oscillation
- Subtractive synthesis
- Voltage-controlled amplifier
- Voltage-controlled oscillator
