= Analog revival =

Period in synthesizer history

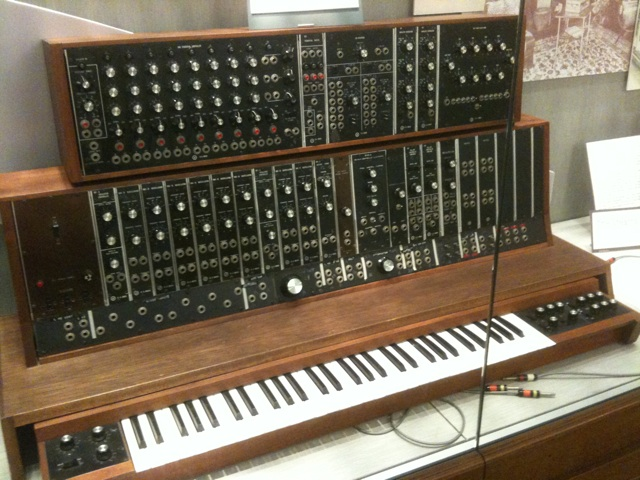
The Moog synthesizer was the first commercial analog synthesizer.

The analog revival is a period in synthesizer history when analog synthesizers returned to commercial production and popular usage. The revival has its roots in the late 20th century but began in earnest during the early 21st century, prompted by the release of several analog synthesizers by companies such as Korg and Moog. This followed a spell of companies producing digital synthesizers after the release of Yamaha's DX7, which was less expensive than analog synthesizers and led to many analog manufacturers going out of business in the 1980s. The emergence of electronic dance music in the late 1980s boosted the popularity of analog synthesizers on the second-hand market and created a demand for the resumed production that major manufacturers took until the early 21st century to capitalize on.

== Background ==
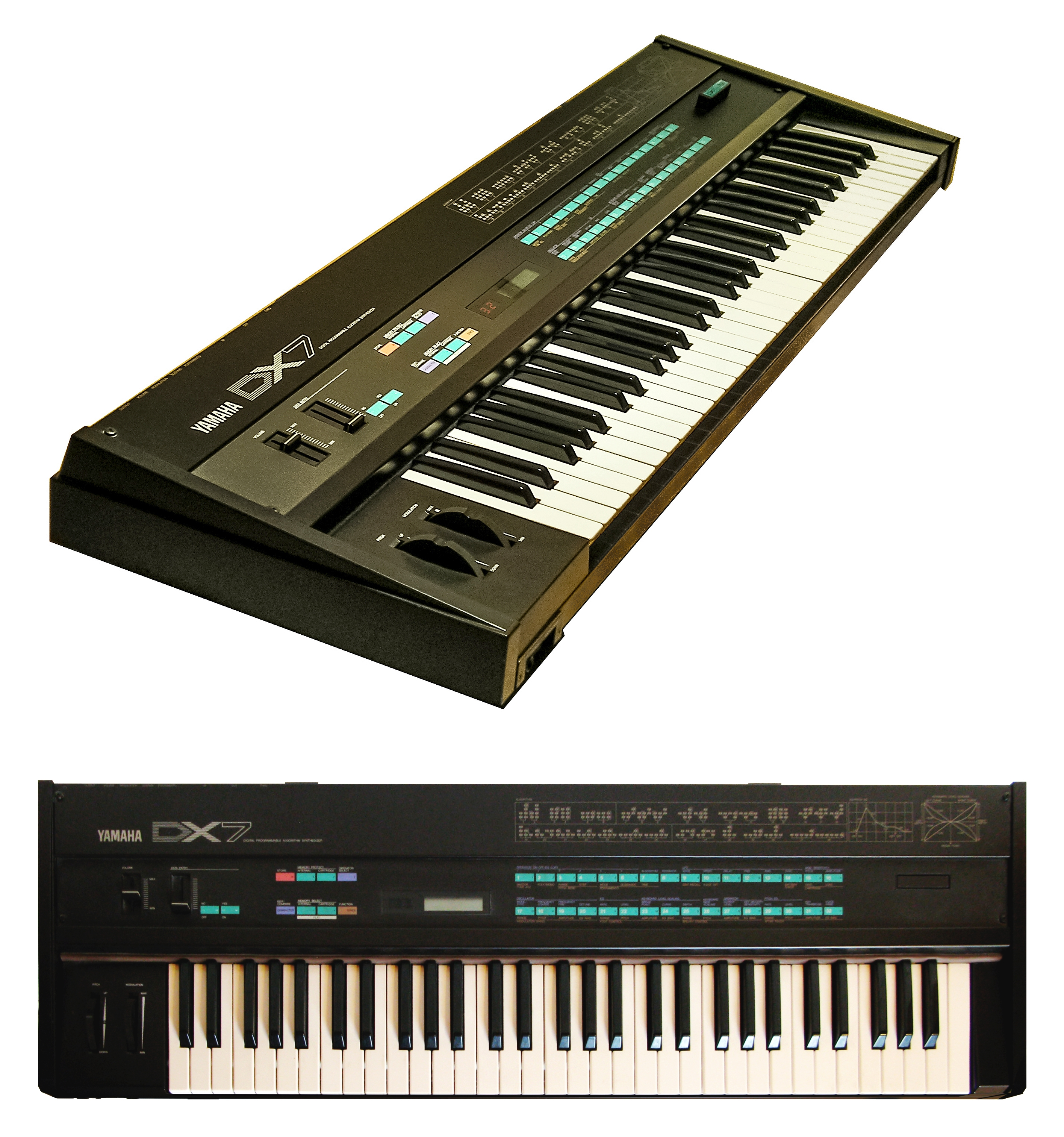
The release of Yamaha's DX7 made affordable digital synthesis available to the public, which overshadowed analog.

Analog synthesizers have been produced since the 1960s, when American engineer Robert Moog created his Moog synthesizer. Synthesizers became widely popular with the release of the smaller and more affordable Minimoog in 1970, causing artists such as the Beatles, Rush, Lipps Inc. and Michael Jackson to begin using them. In 1983, Yamaha released the DX7 digital synthesizer, which was cheaper than its analog counterparts. Studios and producers increasingly used digital synthesizers over analog synthesizers into the late 1980s and 1990s, causing many analog synthesizer companies, including Moog, ARP and Sequential Circuits, to go out of business.

== History ==
=== 20th century: dance music revival ===
Despite the boom in digital synthesizers and their effect on manufacturers, analog synthesizers maintained some relevance throughout the late 20th century. Second-hand synthesizers enjoyed a small amount of use in the during this period; during the early 2000s this was still the case, despite the increasing availability of new analog synthesizers.

The mainstream emergence of electronic dance music in the summer of 1988 contributed to an "evolution of analog synth aesthetics". The movement heavily relied on analog synthesizers and drum machines created by the Roland Corporation several years prior. Roland's TR-808 and TR-909 drum machines and TB-303 bass synth were commercial failures at release due to their lack of realism, but were crucial to this new scene due to their ease of access. Units of these machines were available for resale at low prices on both sides of the Atlantic, making them an attractive entry point for amateur musicians. These instruments saw use in house, techno, hip-hop and other genres, creating a wider interest in analog synthesizers. However, mainstream music was still using digital synthesizers and samplers during this period. Analog synthesizer manufacturers were unable to capitalize on demand since most were out of business; those that remained had embraced digital synthesis and did not want to return to analog.

In the 1990s, some companies tried to appeal to the growing demand by releasing virtual analog synthesizers. Roland released their JD-800 in 1990: while digital, it marked a return to analog-like controls, oscillators and filters. Actual analog synthesizers came back in 1993, when American audio engineer and synth manufacturer Tom Oberheim released the Marion Systems MSR2, a rack-mount synthesizer with digitally controlled analog oscillators, and Novation released the Bass Station: conceived by synthesiser developer Chris Huggett featuring the same filter and VCA as his previously developed EDP Wasp, the Bass Station was of great success thanks to its sonic resemblance of the Roland TB-303, much in vogue in contemporary music. 1994 marked the first analog releases by soon-to-be modular innovators Doepfer with its MS-404 and Analogue Systems with the FB3. Others entered the market towards the end of the century, with virtual analog offerings from Waldorf, Quasimidi and other smaller manufacturers appearing in lieu of major companies.

=== 21st century: mainstream revival ===
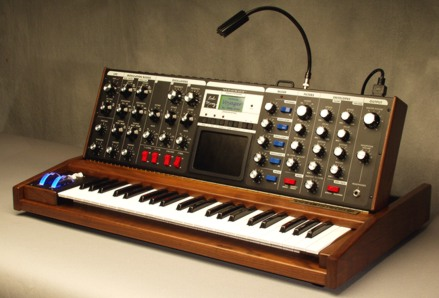
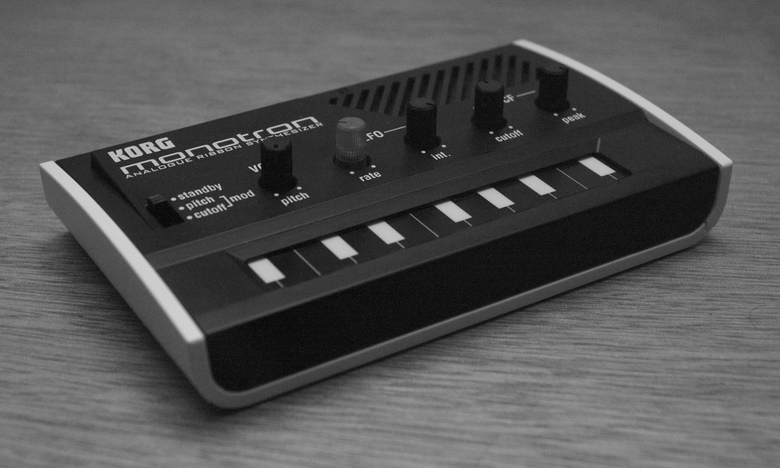
The releases of the Minimoog Voyager (left) and Monotron (right) helped begin the analog revival.

The revival began in earnest during the early 21st century; its beginning is attributed to multiple events, including the release of the Minimoog Voyager in 2002 by the reformed Moog Music, the release of the Korg Monotron in 2010 and the re-release of several vintage synthesizers.

Modular synthesizers, specifically Eurorack, played a part in the revival by spurring major manufacturers to start making new analog synthesizers. Trade shows such as the NAMM Show reported large increases in the number of modular synthesizers in 2015, when there was a 20% increase in synthesizer offerings at the show. The manufacturing switch to surface-mount technology also contributed to the analog revival, as new synthesizers could be made faster for lower costs. The mass production of small analog synthesizers was another factor, as previous designs suffered due to being costly and unwieldy.

The revival began due to a number of perceived advantages of analog synthesizers. Imperfections in the sound can make analog synthesis feel less "sterile". Tom Oberheim said that "there is a warmth to analog", and compared the analog–digital divide to LPs and CDs. (Note: This perceived warmth of analog sounds is a form of mild distortion that is made when analog audio paths are overloaded.) They also suggested that the simple layout and "one-knob-per-function" design help to make a better connection with the player. Oberheim and US synth designer Dave Smith theorized that the demand could be due to a cohort of younger musicians discovering analog synthesizers. Steve Oppenheimer of Electronic Musician suggested that musicians wanted digital and sample-based synthesizers over analog because they could emulate acoustic instruments better, but a new appreciation of analog by electronic musicians caused an "analog renaissance".

As well as the production of new synthesizers, the analog revival has manifested in other ways. Vintage synthesizers are now being sold for large amounts due to demand from modern producers. Digital synthesizers are also beginning to display traits associated with analog, such as more hands-on controls.

== See also ==
- Vinyl revival

== Notes, references and sources ==
=== Sources ===
- "An Analog Revival at NAMM". The Music Trades. 164 (2): 82–84. March 2016. ISSN 0027-4488.
- Barlindhaug, Gaute (2007). "Analog Sound in the Age of Digital Tools". In Lund, Niels Windfeld; Skare, Roswitha; Vårheim, Andreas (eds.). A Document (Re)turn. Frankfurt: Peter Lang. pp. 73–93. ISBN 9783631562949.
- Jenkins, Mark (2007). "Chapter 6: The Analog Revival". Analog Synthesizers. Elsevier. pp. 194–229. ISBN 9780240520728.
- Oppenheimer, Steve (June 2006). "The Analog Revival". Electronic Musician. 22 (6): 10. ISSN 0884-4720.
- Pinch, Trevor; Trocco, Frank (2002). Analog Days: the Invention and Impact of the Moog synthesizer. Cambridge, Massachusetts: Harvard University Press. ISBN 9780674016170.
- Rodgers, Tara (October 2015). "Tinkering with Cultural Memory". Feminist Media Histories. 1 (4). University of California Press: 5–30. doi:10.1525/fmh.2015.1.4.5. eISSN 2373-7492.
- Stefani, Ewan (2022). "The Analogue Synthesizer: Classification, Design and Musical Potential". In Doğantan-Dack, Mine (ed.). Rethinking the Musical Instrument. Newcastle upon Tyne: Cambridge Scholars Publishing. pp. 337–359. ISBN 9781527577893.
