= RS Integrator =

The RS Integrator is a series of analog modular synthesizer systems made by British company Analogue Systems, which had previously manufactured the TH48 step sequencer and FB3 Filterbank.

As with Doepfer's similar A-100 system, modules are designed to be mounted in a standard 19-inch rack enclosure, each module measuring 3U in height. Modules are patched using standard mono miniature (3.5 mm) leads.

Various controller keyboards are available within the RS Integrator series, including the Sorceror (sic), which can house modules inside its wooden enclosure.

Throbbing Gristle founder Chris Carter has used the RS Integrator along with other Analogue Systems equipment.
