= Modular synthesizer =

Synthesizer composed of separate modules

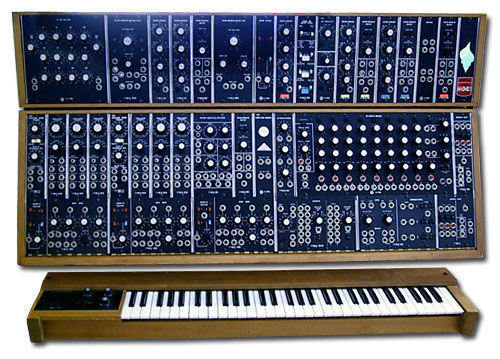
Moog 55 (c. 1972 to c. 1981)

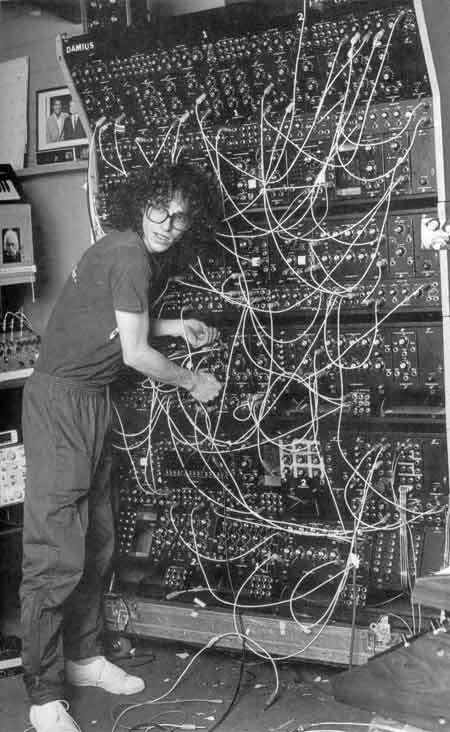
Steve Porcaro of Toto with a modular synthesizer in 1982

Modular synthesizers are electronic musical instruments composed of separate synthesizer modules that represent different functions. The modules can be connected together by the user to create a patch. The outputs from the modules may include audio signals, analog control voltages, or digital signals for logic or timing conditions. Typical modules are voltage-controlled oscillators, voltage-controlled filters, voltage-controlled amplifiers and envelope generators. A modular synth is made up of individual modules which are combined into an instrument. A semi-modular synth allows patching within a fixed set of circuits and fixed user interface.

== History ==
German engineer Harald Bode developed a modular sound processing system in the late 1950s, and this and his paper on using semiconductors in sound processing greatly influenced future development. The first prototype of the Moog synthesizer was introduced at the 1964 Audio Engineering Society convention, and the first Buchla Modular Electronic Music System was released in 1965. The Moog and Buchla were built of separate modules which created and shaped sounds, such as envelopes, noise generators, filters, and sequencers, connected by patch cords, the arrangement of which are called a "patch", specifying a particular sound. At this time, Moog developed the 1v/octave standard for representing musical pitch.

Early modular synthesizers were large and very expensive, mostly sold to university music departments, composers of advertising jingles and to a few wealthy musicians. After the success of Wendy Carlos’ 1968 album Switched-On Bach, there was a surge in modular synth sales, but by 1970 when ARP Instruments introduced their ARP 2500 modular system, sales were already in decline. After 1970, the synthesizer market predominantly shifted to semi-modular and fully integrated synthesizers, such as the semi-modular EMS VCS3, ARP 2600, and the integrated Moog Minimoog.

ARP largely abandoned modulars after 1971, but Moog continued to produce their System 35 and 55 until 1981,. Several new companies entered the market, though, in the 1970s. Polyfusion was founded by two ex Moog employees, initially making new modules for Moog modulars and later developing their 2000 system (as used by Toto). Steiner Parker, Aries and Synton also made significant numbers of modular systems, while many others were made in small numbers. EMS and EML were both early makers of semi-modular synths, the EMS VCS3 being the first really portable (and affordable) synth. E-mu introduced the E-mu Modular System in 1973-4, and went on to develop many features and co-developed the SSM chips which were later used in the Prophet 5 etc. Roland released the semi-modular Roland System 100 in 1975, followed by the modular System 700 in 1976 and the System 100m in 1979. During the same period, Korg released their PS range of semi-modular polyphonic instruments and their MS range of semi-modular monophonic keyboards.

Modular synthesizers have also been distributed in DIY kit form since 1972, when PAiA Electronics released the first of several DIY modular systems, the 2700 and 2720. By 1973, the Serge synthesizer was developed by Serge Tcherepnin, Rich Gold and Randy Cohen at CalArts, which were initially assembled by a collective of students and later sold as kits or assembled instruments. Electronic magazines published modular synth construction articles too, for example the 1973 Practical Electronics and Wireless World modular synth projects, the PE Minisonic and the 1977 Elektor Formant, and Bernard Hutchins published the Electronotes newsletter which, during its publication history, published hundreds of synthesizer circuits that were incorporated into commercial designs.

Moog and Buchla had different approaches to synthesiser function. Moog’s instruments were based on subtractive synthesis, with oscillators producing fixed basic waveforms (sawtooth, square, triangle and sine) then shaping and mellowing them with a voltage-controlled filter, controlled by a keyboard. Buchla used waveshaping and frequency modulation to create new dynamic waveforms, typically controlled by touch-pads, separated audio and control and developed computer control.

By the late 1970s, highly-integrated and often polyphonic keyboard synthesizers, samplers, sound modules, and other MIDI-connected gear dominated the synth market and modular synthesizers had fallen out of favor compared to cheaper, smaller digital and software synthesizers. However, there continued to be a community who chose the physically patched approach, the flexibility and the sound of traditional modular systems.

Since the late 1990s, there has been a resurgence in the popularity of analog synthesizers aided by physical standardization practices, an increase in available retro gear and interest, vastly decreased production costs and increased electronic reliability and stability, the rediscovered ability of modules to control things other than sound, and a generally heightened education through the development of virtual synthesis systems such as VCV Rack, MAX/MSP, Pd and Reaktor etc.

== Types of module ==
The basic modular functions are: signal, control, logic and timing. Typically, inputs and outputs are an electric voltage.

The difference between a synthesizer module and a stand-alone effects unit is that an effects unit will have connections for input and output of the audio signal and knobs or switches for users to control various parameters of the device (for example, the modulation rate for a chorus effect) while a synthesizer module may have connections for input and output, but will also have connections so that the device's parameters can be further controlled by other modules (for example, to connect a low-frequency oscillator module to the modulation input of a delay module to get the chorus effect.)

There exist many different types of modules. Modules with the same basic functions may have different inputs, outputs and controls, depending on their degree of complexity. Some examples include the voltage-controlled oscillator (VCO), which may have options for sync (hard or soft), linear or exponential frequency modulation, and variable waveshape; the voltage-controlled filter (VCF) that may have both resonance and bandwidth controls; and the envelope generator which may provide outputs at each stage of the process. Examples of more complex modules include the frequency shifter, sequencer, and vocoder.

Modular synthesizers may be bulky and expensive. There are some standards that manufacturers follow for their range of physical synthesizers, such as 1 V/octave control voltages, and gate and trigger thresholds providing general compatibility; however, connecting synthesizers from different manufacturers may require cables with different kinds of plugs.

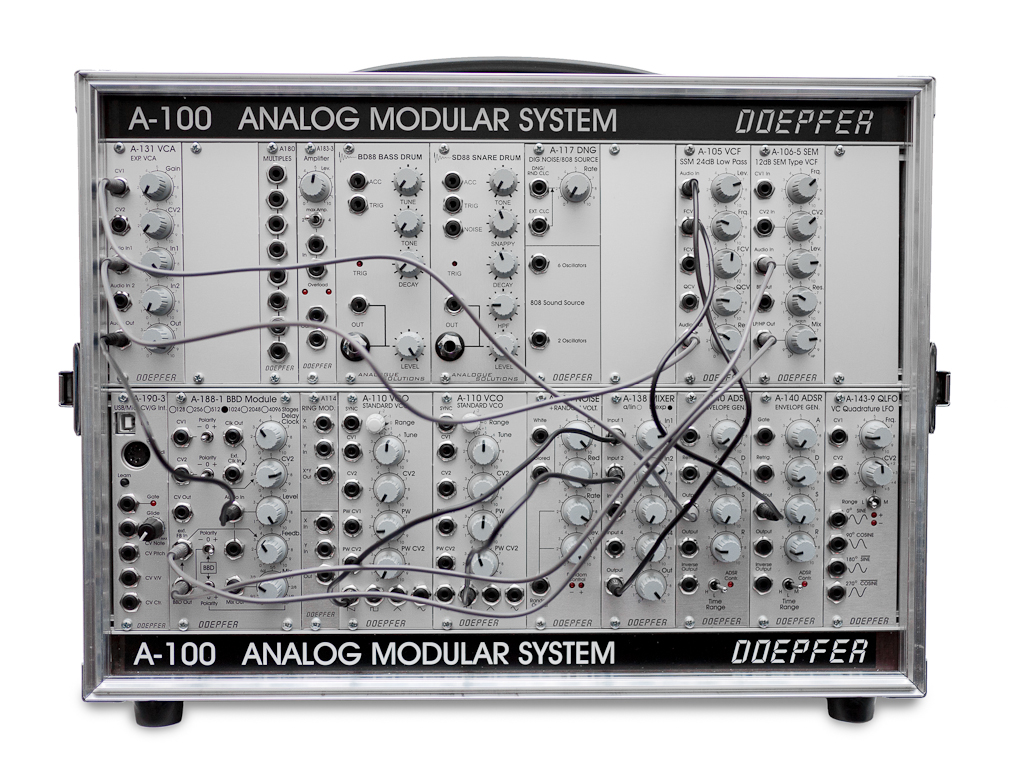
A Doepfer A-100 (1995 to present)

German engineer Dieter Doepfer began his interest in modular synth in the late 70s building an Elektor Formant then designing some extra modules for it. In the 1990s he believed modular synthesizers could still be useful for creating unique sounds, and created a new, smaller modular system, the Doepfer A-100. This led to a new standard for modular systems, Eurorack; as of 2025 several hundred companies, including Moog and Roland, were developing Eurorack modules.. There are also larger 4U and 5U systems available.

=== Typical modules ===
Modules can usually be categorized as either sources or processors. Standard modules found in a modular synthesizer are:

Sources - characterized by an output, but no signal input; it may have control inputs:

- VCO – Voltage-controlled oscillator, outputs a signal whose frequency is a function of input control voltage and settings. In its basic form, these may be simple waveforms (most usually a square wave or a sawtooth wave, but also includes pulse, triangle and sine waves), however these can be dynamically changed through such controls as sync, frequency modulation, and self-modulation.
- Noise source - Common types of noise offered by modular synthesizers include white, pink, and low frequency noise.
- LFO - A low-frequency oscillator may or may not be voltage-controlled. It may be operated with a period anywhere from a fortieth of a second to several minutes. It is generally used as a control voltage for another module. For example, modulating a VCO will produce a frequency modulation perceived as vibrato, while modulating a VCA will produce amplitude modulation perceived as tremolo, depending on the control frequency. A rectangular wave output from an LFO can be used as a logic output for timing or trigger functions on other modules.
- EG - An envelope generator is a transient voltage source. A trigger control signal applied to an envelope generator produces a single, shaped voltage. Often configured as ADSR (attack, decay, sustain, release) it provides a control voltage that rises and falls. Usually it controls the amplitude of a VCA or the cutoff frequency of a VCF, but the patchable structure of the synthesizer makes it possible to use the envelope generator to modulate other parameters such as the frequency or pulse width of the VCO. Simpler EGs (AD or AR) or more complex (DADSR—delay, attack, decay, sustain, release) are sometimes available.
- Sequencer or analog sequencer, is a family of compound module types that may be a source or a processor. As a source, depending upon the configuration, it may produce a sequence of voltages, usually set by adjusting values on front panel knobs. The sequencer may also output a trigger, or gate, at each step. Sequencers are stepped by a trigger being applied to the trigger input. Designs may allow for stepping forwards or backward, oscillating patterns, random order, or only using a limited number of steps. An example of an analog sequencer and controller with this level of complexity is the Doepfer A-154, A-155 combination.

Processors - characterized by a signal input and an output and may have control inputs:

- VCF - Voltage-controlled filter, which attenuates frequencies below (high-pass), above (low-pass) or both below and above (band-pass) a certain frequency. (Note: Some VCFs can also be configured to provide band-reject (notch), whereby the high and low frequencies remain while the middle frequencies are attenuated.) Most VCFs have variable resonance, sometimes voltage-controlled.
- VCA - Voltage-controlled amplifier, varies the amplitude of a signal in response to an applied control voltage. The response curve may be linear or exponential. Also called a two-quadrant multiplier.
- LPG - Low-pass gate, is a compound module, similar to a VCA combined with a VCF. The circuit uses a resistive opto-isolator to respond to the control voltage, which also filters the sound, allowing more high-frequency information through at higher amplification.
- RM - Ring modulator - Two audio inputs are utilized to create sum and difference frequencies while suppressing the original signals. Also called an analog multiplier or frequency mixer.
- Mixer - A module that adds voltages.
- Multiple - Fan out a voltage output to multiple inputs.
- Slew limiter - A sub-audio low-pass filter. When used in a control voltage path to an oscillator, produces a portamento effect.
- S&H - Sample and hold, is usually used as a control-voltage processor. Depending upon the design, usually an ascending edge (trigger), captures the value of the voltage at the input, and outputs this voltage until the trigger input reads another voltage and repeats the process.
- Sequencer, (see also above), as a processor, may have a signal input into each step, (location or stage), which is output, when stepped to. An example of this type of sequencer is the Doepfer A-155.
- Custom control inputs - It is possible to connect any kind of voltage to a modular synthesizer as long as it remains in the usable voltage range of the instrument, usually -15V to +15V.

== Modern manufacturers of modular hardware synthesizers ==
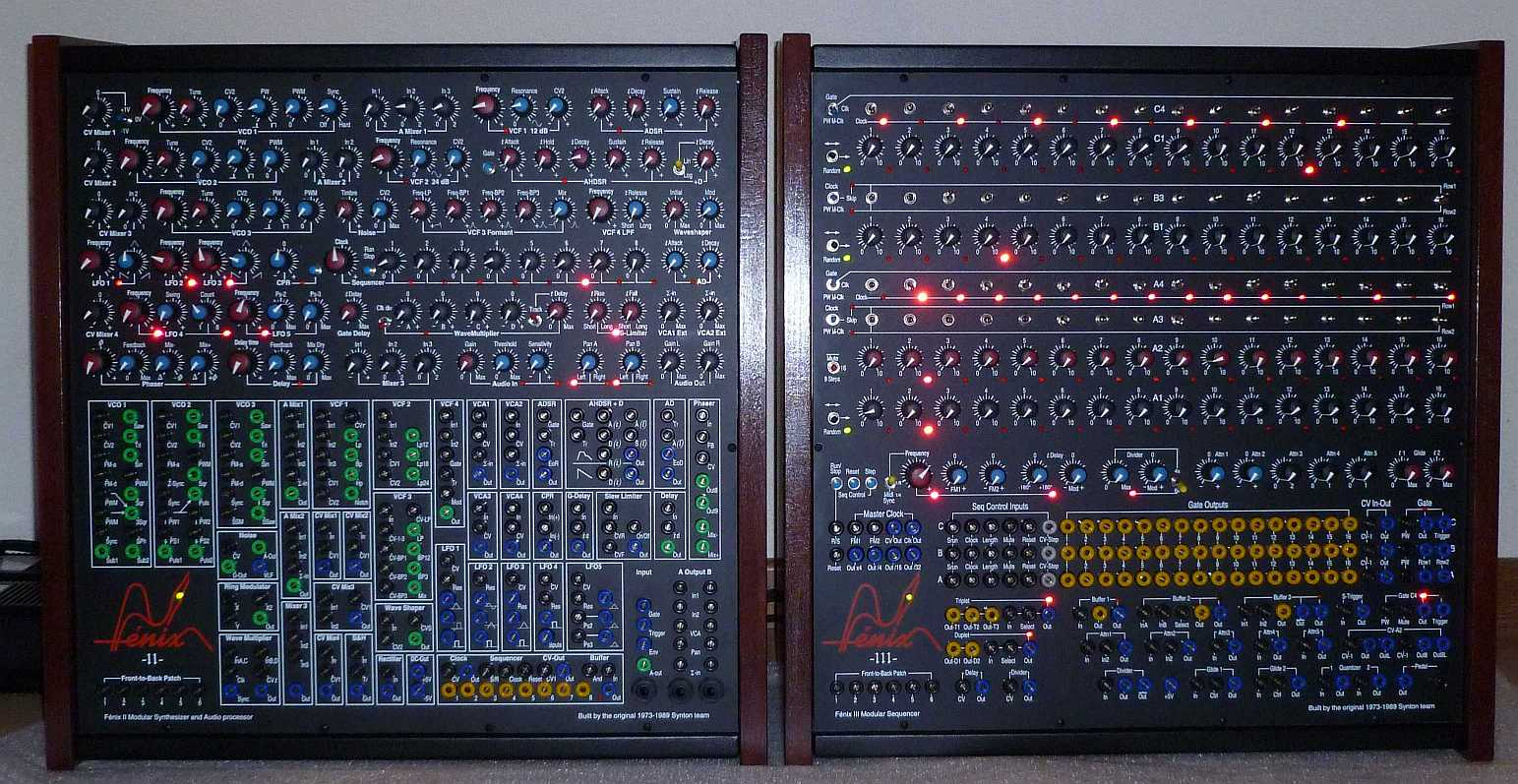
Latest Fénix

Hardware offerings range from complete systems in cases to kits for hobbyists. Many manufacturers augment their range with products based on recent re-designs of classic modules; often both the original and subsequent reworked designs are available free on the Internet, the original patents having lapsed. Many hobbyist designers also make available bare PCB boards and front panels for sale to other hobbyists.

- Buchla Electronic Musical Instruments (formerly Buchla & Associates)
- Doepfer Musikelektronik (A-100)
- Moog Music (formerly Big Briar, formerly Moog)
- Synthesis Technology
- PAiA Electronics
- Analogue Systems
- Sound Transform Systems
- Studio Electronics
- Synthesizers.com
- Synton Fenix

== Modular software synthesizers ==
There are also software synthesizers which are organized as interconnectable modules. Many of these are virtual analog synthesizers, where the modules simulate hardware functionality. Some of them are also virtual modular systems, which simulate real historical modular synthesizers.

- AudioMulch
- Arturia Modular V
- Bidule
- Bitwig Studio (The Grid)
- Cardinal
- ChucK
- CreamwareAudio Modular III
- Csound
- Doepfer
- MaxMSP
- Moog Model 15
- Kyma
- Pure Data
- Reaktor
- SunVox
- SuperCollider
- VCV Rack
- Wren for Windows (open-source)

Software modular synthesizers can reproduce many of the signal-generation and patching functions of hardware modular synthesizers. However, they do not provide the same physical interaction with analog circuitry, knobs, sliders, and patch cables. Software synthesizers can offer a wide range of sound variations and visual patching, often at a lower cost and with fewer space requirements than hardware systems.

The popular plugin formats such as VST may be combined in a modular fashion.

== Semi-modular synthesizers ==
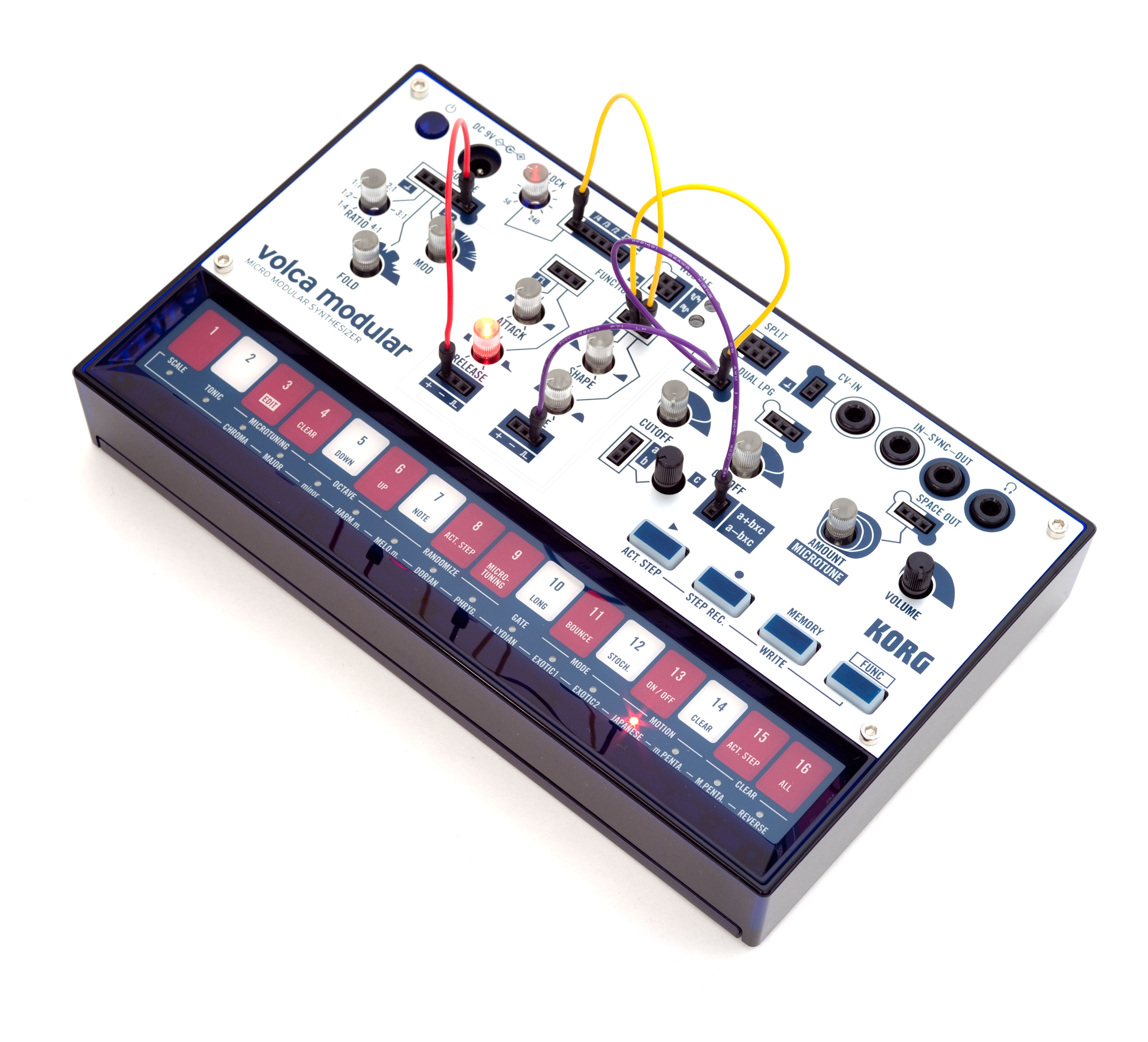
The Volca Modular, a compact semi-modular synthesiser

A modular synthesizer has a case or frame into which arbitrary modules can be fitted; modules are usually connected together using patch cords and a system may include modules from different sources, as long as it fits the form factors of the case and uses the same electrical specifications.

A semi-modular synthesizer on the other hand is a collection of modules from a single manufacturer that makes a cohesive product, an instrument. Modules may not be swapped out and usually a typical configuration has been pre-wired. The modules are typically not separable and may physically be parts of a contiguous circuit board. However, the manufacturer provides a mechanism to allow the user to re-arrange the connections between modules.

=== Matrix systems ===
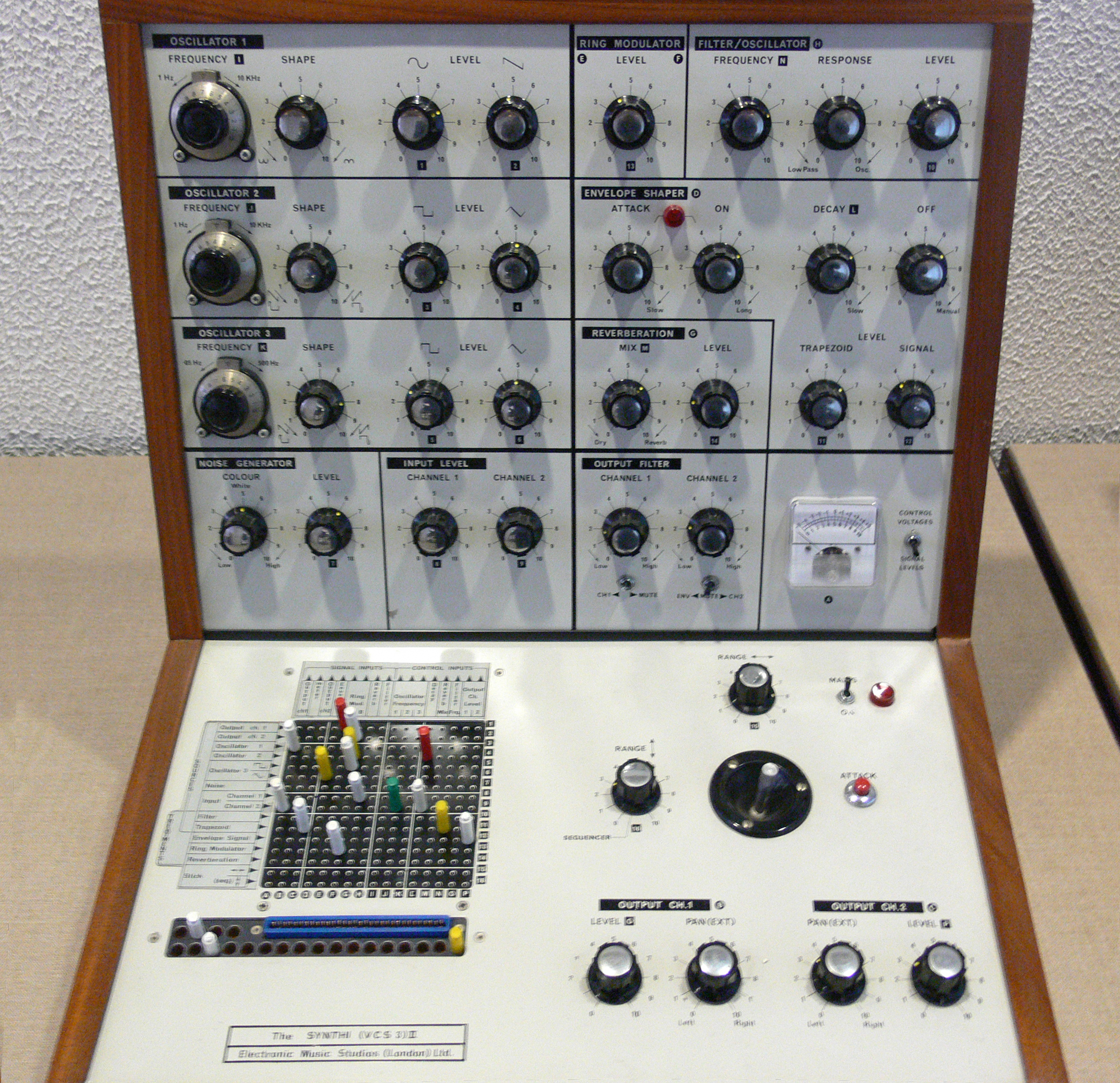
EMS Synthi (VCS 3) II uses a pin matrix for patching

Matrix systems use pin matrices or other crosspoint switches rather than patch cords. The ARP 2500 was the first synthesizer to use a fixed switch matrix. The pin matrix was made popular in the EMS VCS-3 and its descendants like the EMS Synthi 100. Other systems include the ETI 4600, and the Maplin 5600s.

The clean logical layout of these matrices has inspired a number of manufacturers like Arturia to include digitally programmable matrices in their analog or virtual analog synthesizers. Many fully digital synthesizers, like the Alesis Ion, make use of the logic and nomenclature of a modulation matrix, even when the graphical layout of a hardware matrix is completely absent.

=== Patch override systems ===
The different modules of a semi-modular synthesizer are wired together into a typical configuration but can be re-wired by the user using patch cords. Some examples are the ARP 2600, Anyware Semtex, Cwejman S1, EML101, Evenfall Minimodular, Future Retro XS, Korg MS-10 / MS-20 / PS-3100 / PS-3200 / PS-3300, Mungo State Zero, Roland System 100, Korg Volca Modular and Moog Mother-32 .

=== Electronically reconfigurable systems ===
Reconfigurable systems allow certain signals to be routed through modules in different orders without the use of patch cords. Examples include the Oberheim Matrix and Rhodes Chroma, and Moog Voyager.

== Hybrid modular synthesizers ==
Hybrid synthesizers use hardware and software in combination to realize patches. Examples include the Arturia Origin by Arturia (fully self-contained), Clavia Nord Modular and Clavia Nord Modular G2 (these need an external computer to edit patches) and Audiocubes.

== See also ==
- Chiptune
- Circuit bending
- Sound module
- Switched-On Bach
