= Synton Fenix =

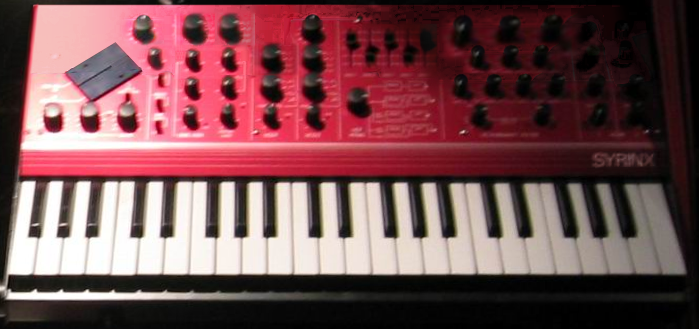
Synton Syrinx (1983–1984)

Synton was a manufacturer and distributor of high-end electronic music equipment in the Netherlands. They were one of the principal importers of music equipment from E-Mu, Ensoniq, and Fairlight in Europe. Felix Visser, the founder of Synton began the company in 1973 after purchasing an EMS Synthi AKS and setting out to produce similar equipment with more of the functionality that he was looking for in an analog synth. Eventually, the company developed Synton Syntovox vocoders as well as the System 2000 and System 3000 modular synthesizers that were sold to Karlheinz Stockhausen and distributed in the United States by Bob Moog's Big Briar Inc. In 1983, Felix Visser, product specialist Marc Paping, and designer Bert Vermeulen created the Synton Syrinx, a monophonic analog synthesizer that contained unique features such as a metal touchplate for manipulating sound as well as a formant filter. In 1989, the company went bankrupt.

== Fénix Modular ==
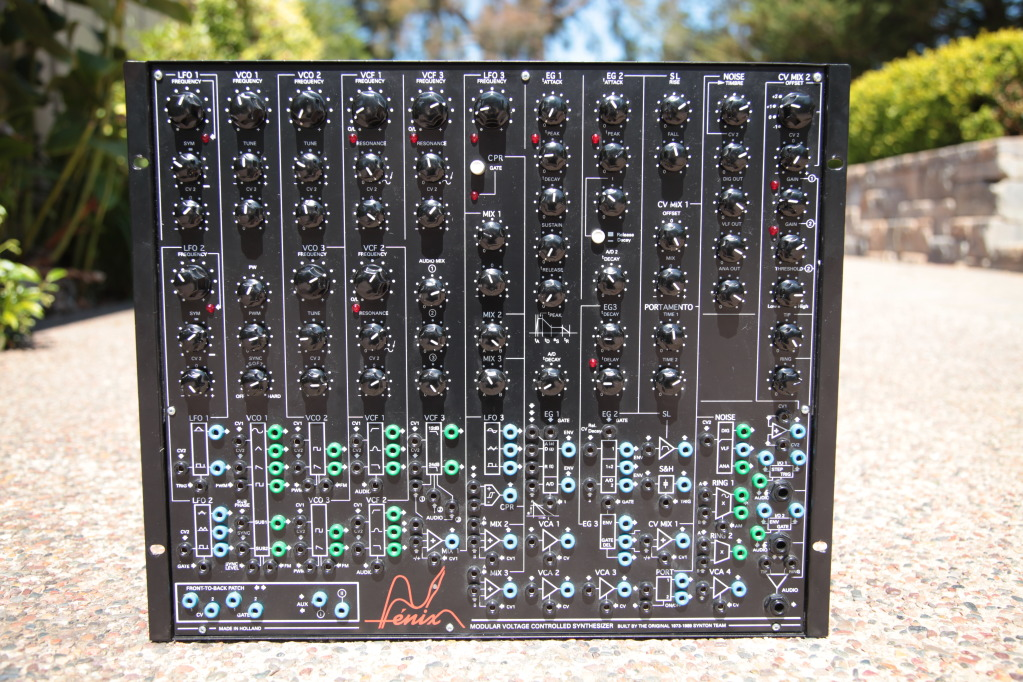
Fénix I

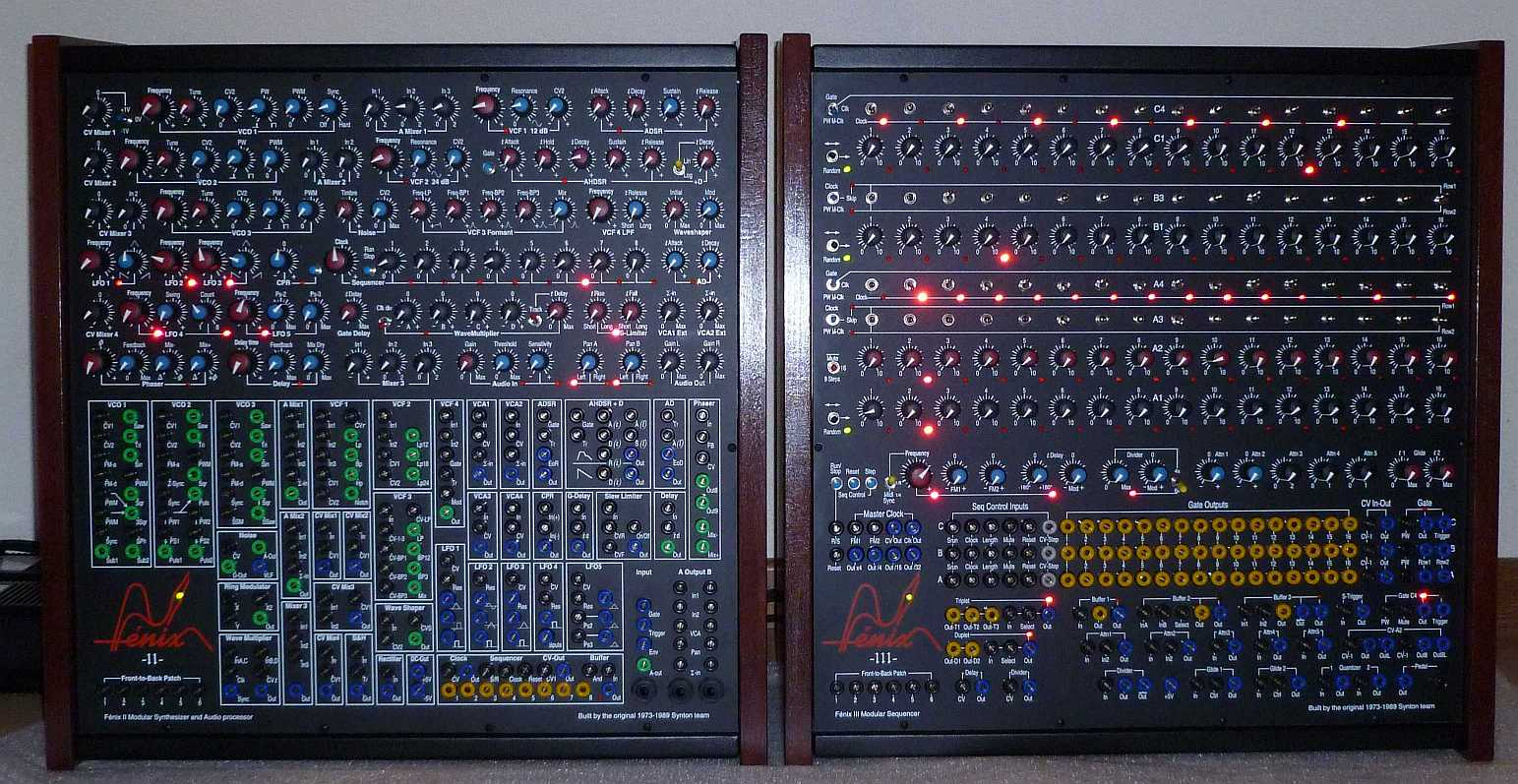
Fénix II and III

Because none of the commercial analog synthesizers on the market had the same features as the synthesizer he wanted, Marc Paping and Bert Vermeulen reunited in 1997 to create the Synton Fénix, an analogue modular synthesizer featuring 31 differing modules. The Synton Fénix featured an esoteric range of features and was the culmination of the designs that Paping and Vermeulen had liked in the vintage analog synthesizers that they had owned, played, and developed in the past. After creating an initial 25 handbuilt units and distributing these to close friends and fans of the Synton company, the team decided to handbuild another 50 units due to high demand from word of mouth. In total, only 75 units were created and the team stopped production of the Fenix in 2000. Musicians have cited the Synton Fénix as their favourite piece of musical equipment due to the combination of unique modules and distinctive sounds the synthesizer was able to create.

Following on from this success, Bert developed a second, updated modular synthesiser, the Fénix II and a separate but accompanying sequencer, the Fénix III. According to the "Q&A" section of the Fénix website:

"The prototype of the [Fénix II] has 103 potmeters, 9 switches and 230 banana sockets compared to the fenix 1 which have 63 potmeters, 3 switches and 158 banana sockets.The prototype of the [Fénix II] has 3 times the number of ic's compared to the Fenix 1".

A limited production run commenced in 2010 once the design had been finalised. Again, 75 synthesisers were made, with just 25 of the Fénix III sequencers being manufactured. All of the units were sold to people who had joined an earlier email "waiting list" which opened during 2009.

== Artists who use Synton Fenix ==
- David Morley
- Aphex Twin
- Téléplasmiste
- John Frusciante
- Martin Gore
- Goodiepal
- Thighpaulsandra
