= VCV Rack =

Virtual eurorack digital audio workstation

- Original author: Andrew Belt
- Stable release: 2.5.2 / 29 May 2024; 18 months ago
- Repository: github.com/VCVRack/
- Written in: C++
- Operating system: Linux, macOS, Microsoft Windows
- Type: modular synthesizer
- License: GPL license V3 and proprietary for some graphics and 3rd party modules
- Website: vcvrack.com

VCV Rack is a free and open-source cross-platform software modular synthesizer.

== Overview ==
VCV Rack is a free open-source virtual modular synthesizer: multiple modules can be connected to synthesize a sound. By default, the software contains several VCOs, LFOs, mixers, and other standard synthesizer modules. However, more can be added as plugins through the VCV Rack website.

Version 1.0.0 added a stable API, a multithreading engine and support for polyphonic signals.

Version 2.0.0 was officially announced in September 2021 and released on November 30, 2021.

=== Interconnectivity ===
In addition to the above features, VCV Rack can also connect to other hardware and software by outputting analog CV/gate and digital USB or MIDI signals. The software can also connect to other VST plugins though the module "host". The ability to use VCV Rack itself as a VST plugin within other audio applications was added upon the release of Rack 2.0.
