= MOTM =

Modular synthesizer system manufactured by Synthesis Technology

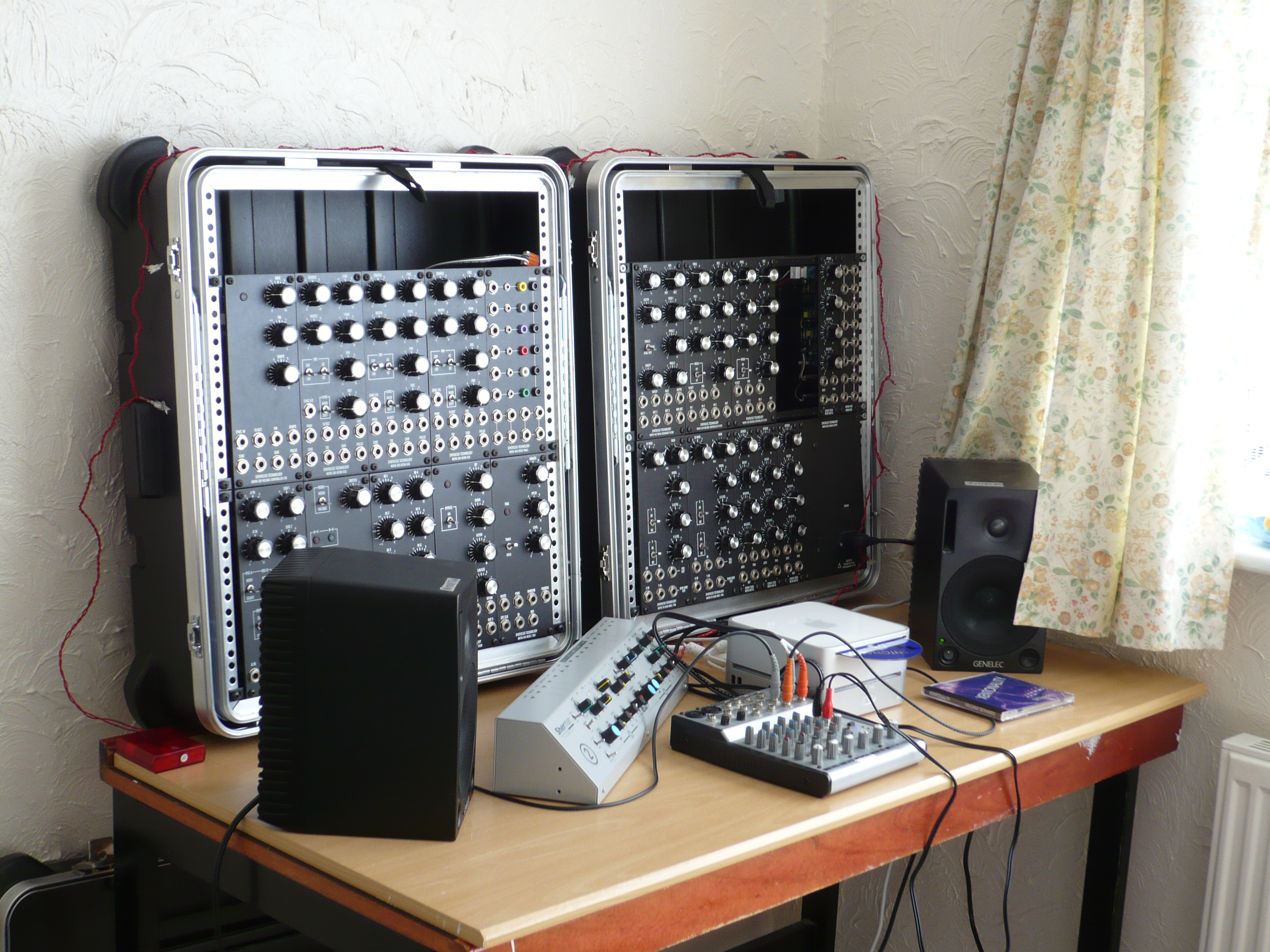
MOTM modular synthesizer

MOTM is the name of the modular synthesizer system manufactured by Synthesis Technology. MOTM is an acronym for "Module of the Month".

== History ==
MOTM was created by Paul Schreiber in 1998. The system was created in part due to the renewed interest in large-format analog modular systems that occurred in the late 1990s. Between 1998 and 2021, over 8000 modules were sold. The company, Synthesis Technology, also offered a limited number of modules in Eurorack and Frac format.

DIY synthesizer retailer synthCube took over distribution of MOTM modules in 2015, when synthCube acquired the assets of Bridechamber. Synthesis Technology stopped manufacturing Eurorack modules in July, 2023, as a result of Paul Schreiber's planned retirement.

== Specifications ==
MOTM systems use a ±15 volt power supply for most modules, with an additional 5 volt power supply required for some digital modules. Audio signals are the standard 10 volts, peak to peak. The MOTM system modules are all "5U" high (1U being 1.75 inches), and multiples of 1U wide. All 5U MOTM modules use 1/4-inch jacks for audio/CV signals. Euro and Frac modules use 3.5mm" (~1/8") jacks. MOTM modules can be mounted in a standard 19" rack using MOTM 19A rack rails, although many users have custom cabinets made of metal or wood.

== Euro and Frac modules ==
In early 2006, Synthesis Technology released a limited number of Frac format modules, using 3.5mm jacks and a smaller overall form factor compatible with PAiA Electronics and Blacet modular systems. This was followed by the release of four Eurorack modules (also called 3U, compatible with systems from Doepfer and many other manufacturers).

Although full MOTM systems are only available in 5U format, the currently available Frac and Euro modules provide unique functionality that is somewhat different from the 5U MOTM modules. For example, in Frac format, the MOTM-1190 (Dual VCA) and MOTM-1800 (Looping ADSR) are similar but not identical in functionality to their 5U counterparts (the MOTM-190 and MOTM-800 respectively).

In Euro format, most of the currently available modules offer functionality that does not currently have an equivalent in MOTM 5U format. The E440 Discrete OTA VCF module is one exception, being very similar to the MOTM-440 (which is based on the SSM 2040 filter from the Sequential Circuits Prophet-5).

== Modules ==
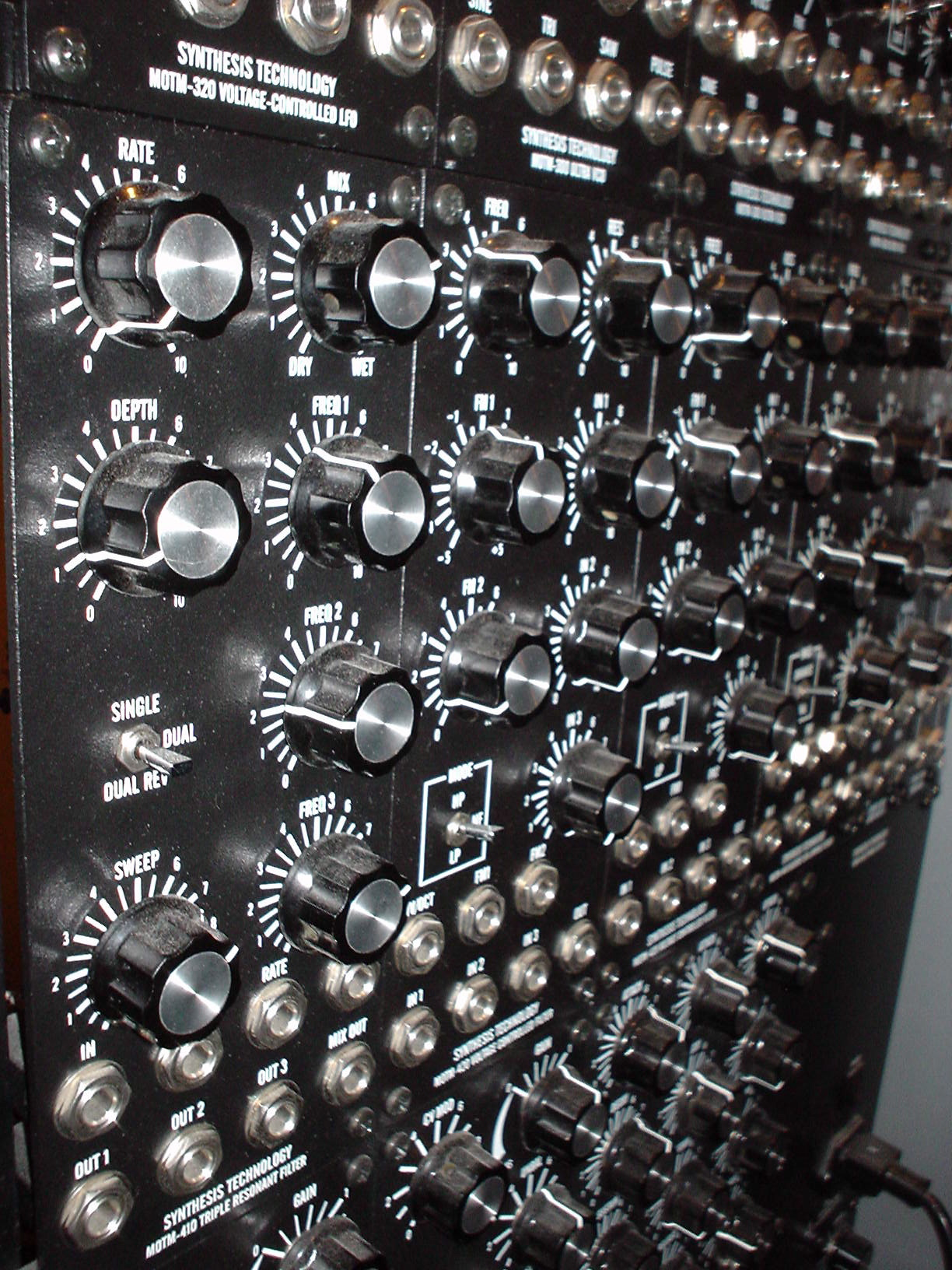
MOTM modules

The Modules are divided into categories, based on their function.

- 100 Series - VCA, Noise, etc.
  - MOTM-100 Noise Generator / Sample & Hold (replaced by MOTM-101)
  - MOTM-101 Noise Generator / Sample & Hold
  - MOTM-110 VCA / Ring Modulator (discontinued, replaced by MOTM-190)
  - MOTM-120 Sub Octave Multiplexer
  - MOTM-190 Micro VCA
- 300 Series - Oscillators
  - MOTM-300 Ultra VCO
  - MOTM-310 Micro VCO
  - MOTM-320 VC LFO
  - MOTM-380 Quad LFO
  - MOTM-390 Micro LFO
- 400 Series - Filters
  - MOTM-410 Triple Resonant VCF
  - MOTM-420 Korg MS-20 VCF
  - MOTM-440 Discrete OTA VCF
  - MOTM-450 Moog 907A Filter Bank (unreleased)
  - MOTM-480 Yamaha CS-80 VCF
  - MOTM-485 Yamaha GX-1 VCF
  - MOTM-490 Moog Transistor Ladder VCF
- 500 - Various 'Unusual' Modules
  - MOTM-510 Wavewarper (X*(Y/Z)^m analog function)
  - MOTM-520 Cloud Generator (unreleased)
- 600 - Digital Source/Utility
  - MOTM-600 MicroSequencer (unreleased)
  - MOTM-650 MIDI to CV converter
- 700 - Analog Logic modules
  - MOTM-700 VC Router
  - MOTM-730 VC Pulse Divider
- 800 - Utility modules
  - MOTM-800 ADSR Envelope Generator
  - MOTM-820 VC Lag Processor
  - MOTM-830 Dual-mode Mixer
  - MOTM-850 Pedal Interface
  - MOTM-890 Micro Mixer
- 900 - Power Supplies, Interconnects
  - MOTM-900 Dual Power Supply (+/- 15V)
  - MOTM-910 Cascade Multiple
  - MOTM-940 Patch Panel
  - MOTM-950 Triple Power Supply (+/- 15V and +5V)
