= Resistive opto-isolator =

Electrical isolation mechanism

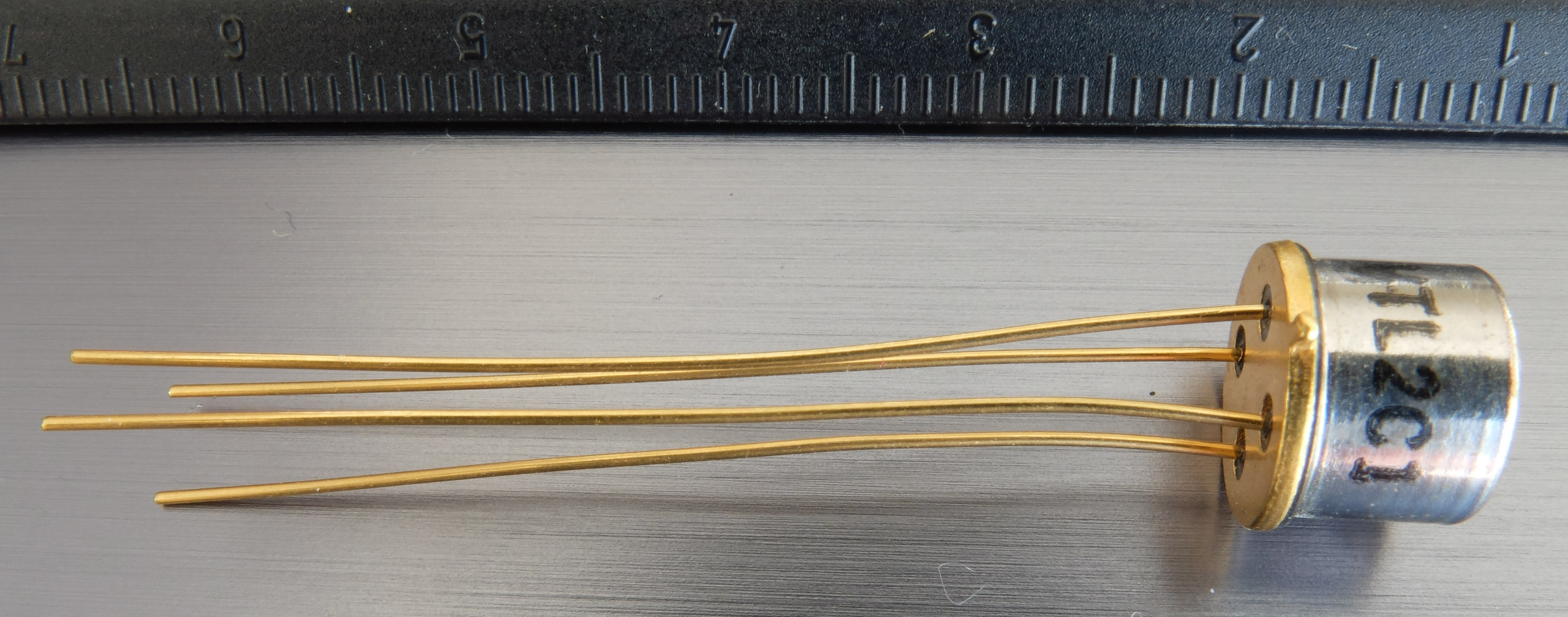
Opto-isolator VTL2C1 with LED input and photoresistor output

Resistive opto-isolator (RO), also called photoresistive opto-isolator, vactrol (after a genericized trademark introduced by Vactec, Inc. in the 1960s), analog opto-isolator (Note: In PerkinElmer literature.) or lamp-coupled photocell, is an optoelectronic device consisting of a source and detector of light, which are optically coupled and electrically isolated from each other. The light source is usually a light-emitting diode (LED), a miniature incandescent lamp, or sometimes a neon lamp, whereas the detector is a semiconductor-based photoresistor made of cadmium selenide (CdSe) or cadmium sulfide (CdS). The source and detector are coupled through a transparent glue or through the air.

Electrically, RO is a resistance controlled by the current flowing through the light source. In the dark state, the resistance typically exceeds a few MOhm; when illuminated, it decreases as the inverse of the light intensity. In contrast to the photodiode and phototransistor, the photoresistor can operate in both AC and DC circuits and have a voltage of several hundred volts across it. The harmonic distortions of the output current by the RO are typically within 0.1% at voltages below 0.5 V.

RO is the first and the slowest opto-isolator: its switching time exceeds 1 ms, and for the lamp-based models can reach hundreds of milliseconds. Parasitic capacitance limits the frequency range of the photoresistor to ultrasonic frequencies. Cadmium-based photoresistors exhibit a "memory effect": their resistance depends on the illumination history; it also drifts during the illumination and stabilizes within hours, or even weeks for high-sensitivity models. Heating induces irreversible degradation of ROs, whereas cooling to below −25 °C dramatically increases the response time. Therefore, ROs were mostly replaced in the 1970s by the faster and more stable photodiodes and phototransistors. ROs are still used in some sound equipment, guitar amplifiers and analog synthesizers owing to their good electrical isolation, low signal distortion and ease of circuit design.

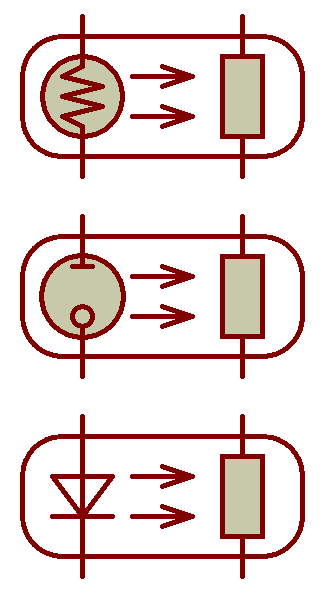
European-style schematics of resistive opto-isolators that use an incandescent bulb (top), a neon lamp (middle) or a light-emitting diode (bottom).

== History ==
In 1873, Willoughby Smith discovered the photoconductivity of selenium. In the early 1900s, the studies of the external photoeffect in vacuum tubes resulted in the commercial production of photoresistors. In 1918, American and German engineers independently suggested the use of vacuum photocells for reading optical phonograms in the film projectors in cinemas, and Lee de Forest, Western Electric and General Electric produced three competing systems using such photocells. In 1927, the first commercial sound film, The Jazz Singer, was produced in the United States, and by 1930 sound films had replaced silent films.

The success of sound films stimulated the search for new applications of photocells. Various types of photocells were considered: vacuum, gas-discharge, photovoltaic and photoresistive, but the industry favored slow yet cheap selenium devices. By the mid-1930s, selenium photocells controlled assembly lines, elevators and looms. Fire alarms with selenium sensors came into mass production in the UK and then in the US. Norbert Wiener proposed, and Truman Gray built an optical scanner for inputting and processing data in analog computers. Kurt Kramer introduced a selenium photocell to medical research. In 1940, Glenn Millikan built the first practical selenium-based oximeter to monitor the physical condition of the Royal Air Force pilots. It was a RO where the light source and detector were separated by the ear lobe of the pilot.

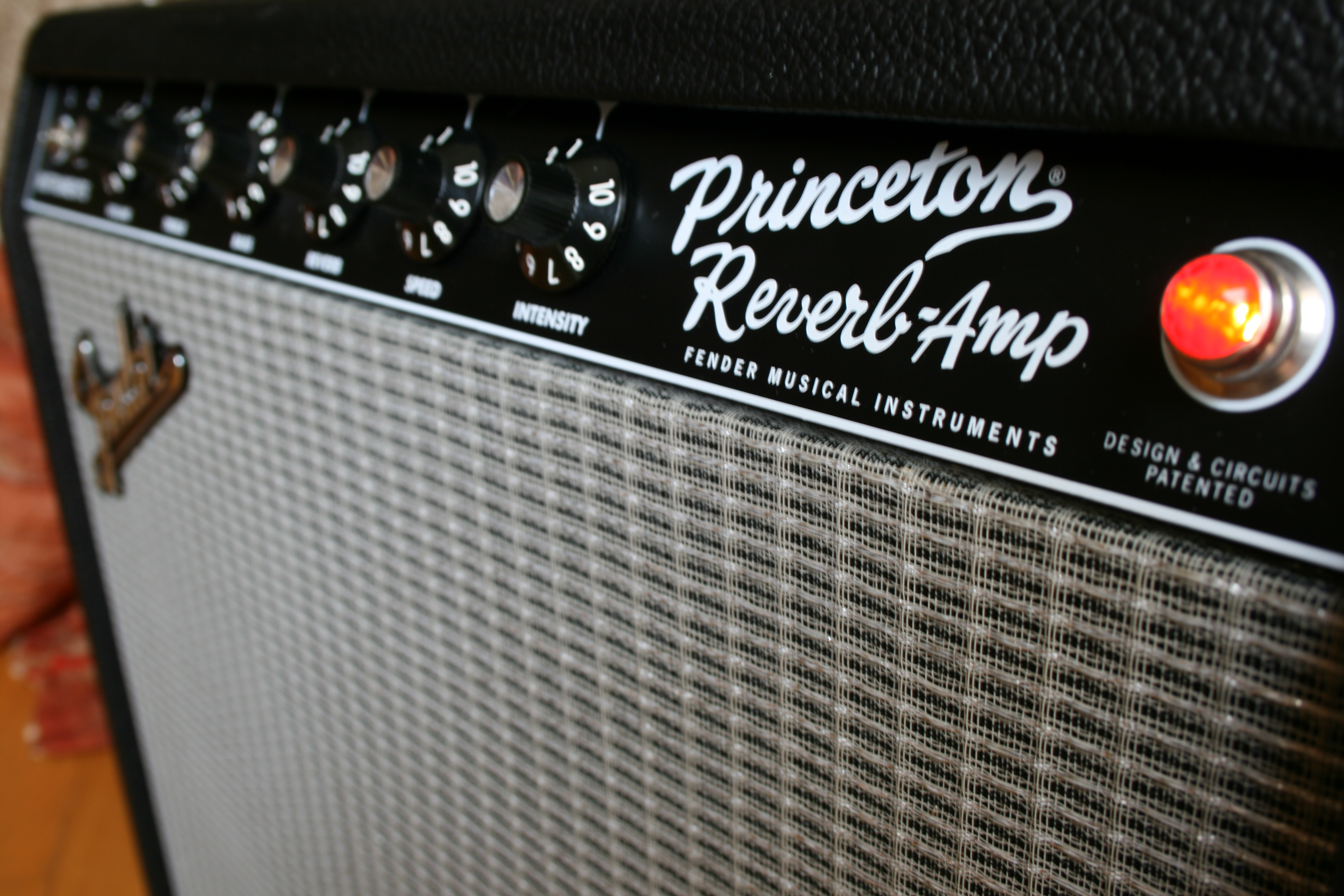
Fender guitar amplifier with a tremolo effect

In the early 1950s, Teletronix used the "T4" optical attenuator in the LA-2 compressor, furthermore, for their unique sound, they are still used today by Universal Audio in their reproductions of the LA-2. After the 1950s selenium in photocells was gradually replaced by CdS and CdSe. By 1960, ROs based on incandescent lamps and CdS/CdSe photoresistors were used in feedback circuits in the industry, for example, for controlling rotation speed and voltage. In the early 1960s, the introduction of sensitive and compact CdS/CdSe photoresistors resulted in the mass production of cameras with automatic exposure. However, these photoresistors were not adopted in medicine because of their memory effect and rapid aging – they required regular recalibration that was not acceptable for medical practice.

In the early 1960s, Gibson and Fender started using ROs to modulate the tremolo effect in guitar amplifiers. Both companies were assembling their ROs from discrete lamps, photoresistors and coupling tubes. While Gibson used cheap but slow incandescent lamps as light sources, Fender replaced them with neon lamps, which increased the maximum frequency to tens of Hz and reduced controlling currents, but resulted in a nonlinear modulation. Therefore, other producers preferred incandescent lamps for their linearity.

In 1967 Vactec introduced a compact RO branded as Vactrol. Unlike the tube-coupled ROs of Fender and Gibson, Vactrols were sealed and sturdy devices. In the early 1970s, Vactec replaced incandescent bulbs with LEDs. This increased the switching speed, but not to the level required for digital devices. Therefore, the introduction of the faster photodiodes and phototransistors in the 1970s pushed out ROs from the market. ROs retained narrow application niches in sound equipment and some industrial automation devices that did not require high speeds. Vactec did not extend their rights to the trademark Vactrol, and it has become a household word in the English language for any RO used in audio equipment, including the ROs of Fender and Gibson. As of 2010, the Vactrol ROs were produced by PerkinElmer, the successor of Vactec until its illumination and detection solutions businesses were divested as an independent company Excelitas Technologies in November 2010. Excelitas ended the production of ROs in December 2015. As of 2022 Vactrol type ROs are still manufactured by successor of Silonex the Advanced Photonix. and at least two factories in Shenzhen, China.

In the European Union, the production and distribution of Cd-based photoresistors is banned since January 1, 2010. The initial version of the EU Directive on the restriction of hazardous substances (RoHS), adopted in 2003, allowed the use of cadmium in the devices that had no Cd-free counterparts. However, in 2009 the European Commission excluded Cd-based ROs used in professional audio equipment from the list of permitted devices. "From 2 January 2013, the use of cadmium is permitted in photoresistors for analogue optocouplers applied in professional audio equipment. ... However, the exemption is limited in time, since the Commission considers that the research for cadmium-free technology is in progress and substitutes could become available by the end of 2013."

== Physical properties ==
=== Light sources, detectors and their coupling ===
Most ROs use CdS or CdSe as light-sensitive material.

The spectral sensitivity of CdS photoresistors peaks for red light (wavelength λ = 640 nm) and extends up to 900 nm. These devices can control a few mA, and have a quasilinear dependence of photocurrent on the light intensity at a constant voltage. Their high dark resistance, reaching tens GOhm, provides a high dynamic range with respect to the light intensity and low signal distortions. However, their reaction time to a change in the light intensity is long, about 140 ms at 25 °C.

CdSe photoresistors are 5–100 times more sensitive than CdS devices; their sensitivity peaks in the red to near-infrared region (670–850 nm) and extends up to 1100 nm. They have an inferior dynamic range and linearity than their CdS counterparts, but are faster, with a time constant of less than 20 ms.

The optimal light sources for CdS/CdSe photoresistors are AlGaAs heterostructures (emission wavelength ~660 nm) or GaP LEDs (λ = 697 nm). The luminosity of the LED is nearly proportional to the controlling current. The emission spectrum depends on the temperature of LED, and thus on the current, but this variation is too small to affect the spectral matching of the LED and photoresistor.

For mechanical stability, the LED and photoresistor are glued with a transparent epoxy, glue or an organic polymer. The glue also functions as a diffuser spreading the light beam – if it would fall near the border of the semiconductor and electrical contacts then a slight shift of the LED position might significantly alter the RO response.

=== Transfer characteristic ===
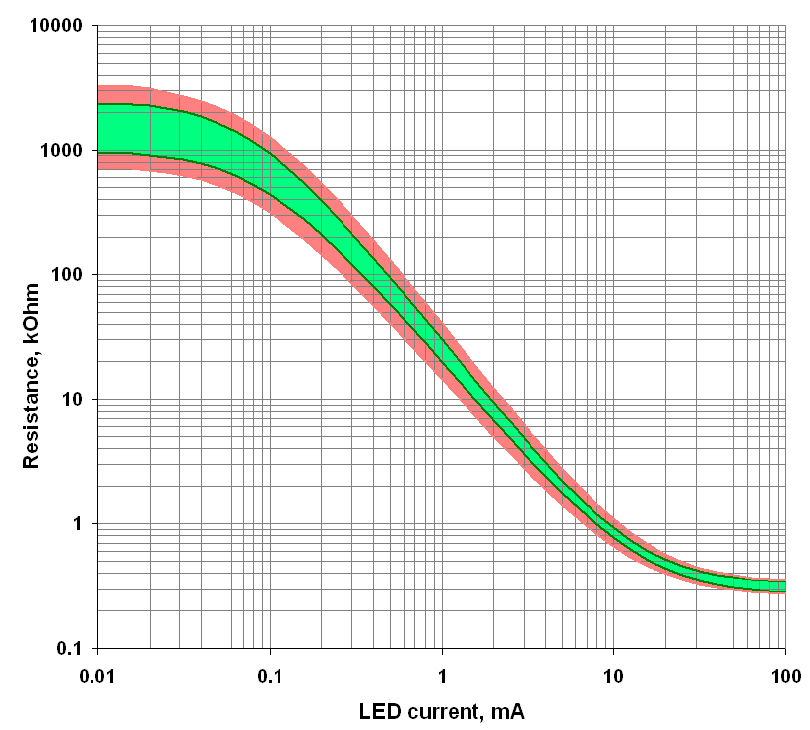
Idealized transfer function of an LED-based RO, i.e., dependence of the RO resistance on the LED current. Green band approximates fluctuations in resistance caused by memory effect at room temperature. Red band approximates effects of thermal drift and changes in optical coupling.

The transfer characteristic of RO is usually represented as the electrical resistance of the photoresistor as a function of the current through the light source; it is a convolution of three main factors: the dependence of light source intensity on its current, optical coupling and spectral matching between the light source and photoresistor, and the photoresponse of the photoresistor. The first dependence is almost linear and temperature independent for LEDs in the practical range of the controlling current. On the contrary, for incandescent lamps the light-current curve is not linear, and the emission spectrum varies with temperature, and thus with the input current. As to the light detector, its properties depend on temperature, voltage and the history of utilization (memory effect). Therefore, the transfer characteristic takes a range of values.

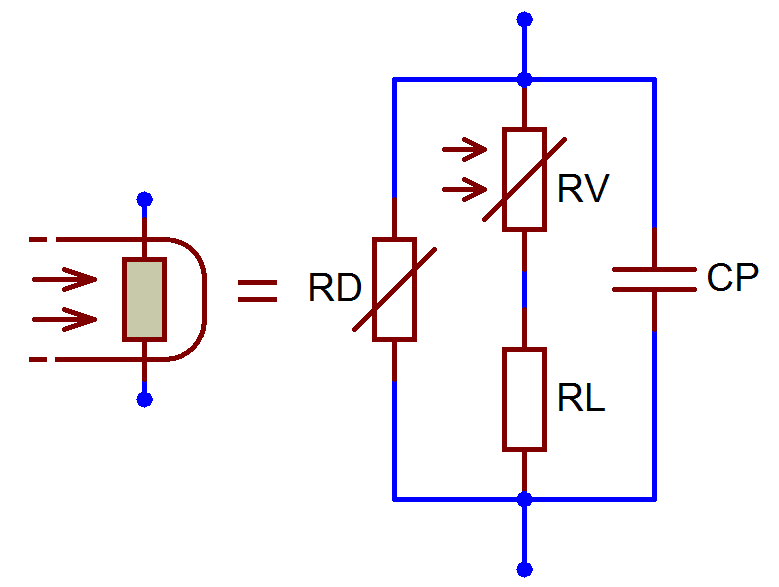
Approximation of a photoresistor.

The equivalent circuit of the photoresistor consists of three components:

- R_{D} – dark resistance, which is determined by the semiconductor and can range from a few MOhm to hundreds GOhm;
- R_{RL} – residual resistance of illuminated but non-loaded photoresistor, typically between 100 Ohm and 10 kOhm;
- R_{I} – ideal photoresistance, which is inversely proportional to the light intensity.

Because of the large value of R_{D}, the total resistance is mainly determined by R_{I}. The dynamic range of the photoresistor with respect to illumination is equal to the ratio of the critical illumination Φ_{cr} to the sensitivity threshold Φ_{th}.

R_{D} and R_{I}, but not R_{RL}, decrease with increasing voltage that results in signal distortions. At low illumination levels, the resistance of cadmium-based ROs increases by about 1% upon heating by 1 °C. At higher light intensities, the thermal coefficient of resistance can change its values and even its sign.

=== Memory effect ===
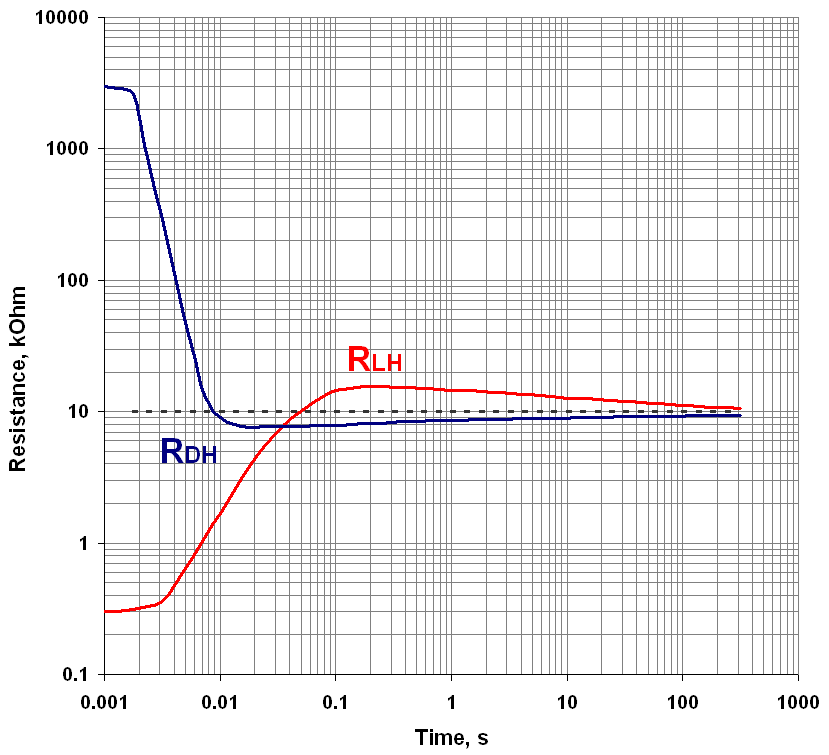
Typical response of a photoresistor to step-increase (blue) and step-decrease (red) in incident light level.

Cadmium-based photoresistors exhibit a pronounced memory effect, that is, their resistance depends on the history of illumination. It also shows characteristic overshoots, with the values reaching a temporary minimum or maximum after application of light. These resistivity changes affect the RO temperature, bringing additional instabilities. The stabilization time nonlinearly increases with the light intensity and can vary between hours and days; by convention, it is assumed that the output of an illuminated RO reaches equilibrium within 24 hours.

The memory effect is evaluated using the ratio of R_{max} to R_{min} (see figure). This ratio increases with decreasing light intensity and has a value of 1.5–1.6 at 0.1 lux and 1.05–1.10 at 1000 lux for PerkinElmer devices. In some low-resistive RO models this ratio was as high as 5.5, but by 2009 their production has been discontinued. High-resistance photoresistors typically have a less pronounced memory effect, are less sensitive to temperature, and have a more linear response, but are also relatively slow. Some devices designed in the 1960s had a negligible memory effect, but exhibited unacceptably high signal distortions at high current levels.

=== Operating frequencies ===
The operating frequency range of a RO depends on the input and output characteristics. The highest frequency of the input (controlling) signal is limited by the response of the RO light source to the change in the controlling current and by the response of the photoresistor to light; its typical value ranges between 1 and 250 Hz. The response time of a photoresistor to switching off of the light typically varies between 2.5 and 1000 ms, whereas the response to switching the illumination on is about 10 times faster. As to the light source, its reaction time to a current pulse is in the nanosecond range for an LED, and is therefore neglected. However, for an incandescent lamp it is on the order of hundreds of milliseconds, which limits the frequency range of the respective ROs to a few Hz.

The maximum output frequency (controlled signal) is limited by the parasitic capacitance of a RO, which originates from the electrodes formed on the surface of the photoresistor and shunts the output circuit. A typical value of this capacitance is tens of picofarads that practically limits the output frequency to approximately 100 kHz.

=== Noise and signal distortions ===
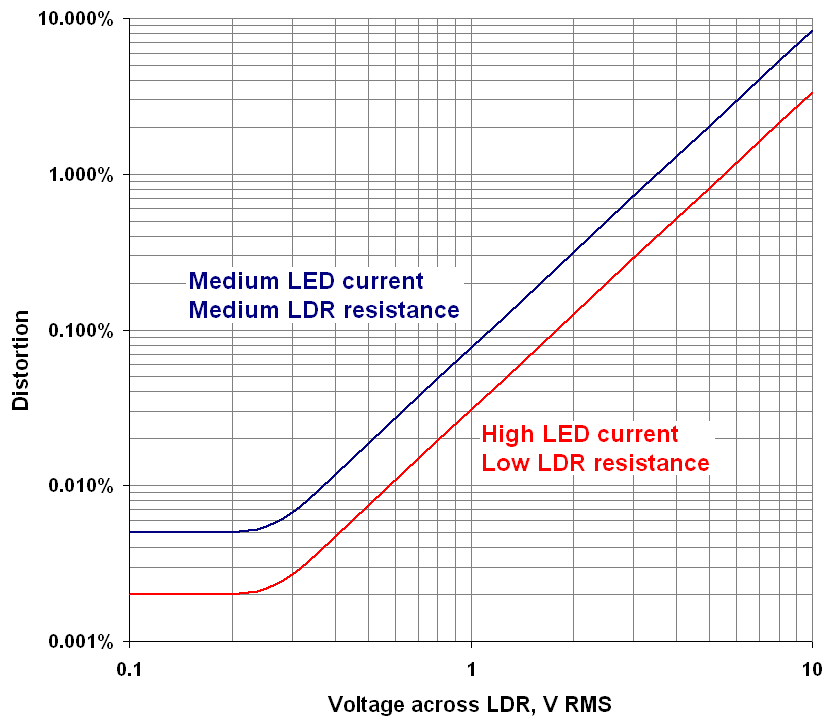
Typical dependences of the coefficient of nonlinear distortions on the root mean square voltage across a PerkinElmer photoresistor.

As for ordinary resistors, the noise of photoresistors consists of thermal, shot and flicker noise; the thermal component dominates at frequencies above 10 kHz and brings a minor contribution at low frequencies. In practice, the noise of a photoresistor is neglected, if the voltage across its terminals is lower than 80 V.

Nonlinear distortions generated by the photoresistor are lower for a higher light intensity and for a lower resistance of the photoresistor. If the voltage across the photoresistor does not exceed the threshold, which varies between 100 and 300 mV depending on the material, then the coefficient of nonlinear distortions has a value within 0.01%, which is almost independent of the voltage. These distortions are dominated by the second harmonic. Above the voltage threshold, the third harmonic appears, and the amplitude of the distortions increases as the square of the voltage. For a distortion of 0.1% (−60 dB), which is acceptable for high-fidelity sound equipment, the signal voltage should be within 500 mV. The ratio of even and odd harmonics can be controlled by applying a DC bias to the photoresistor.

=== Degradation ===
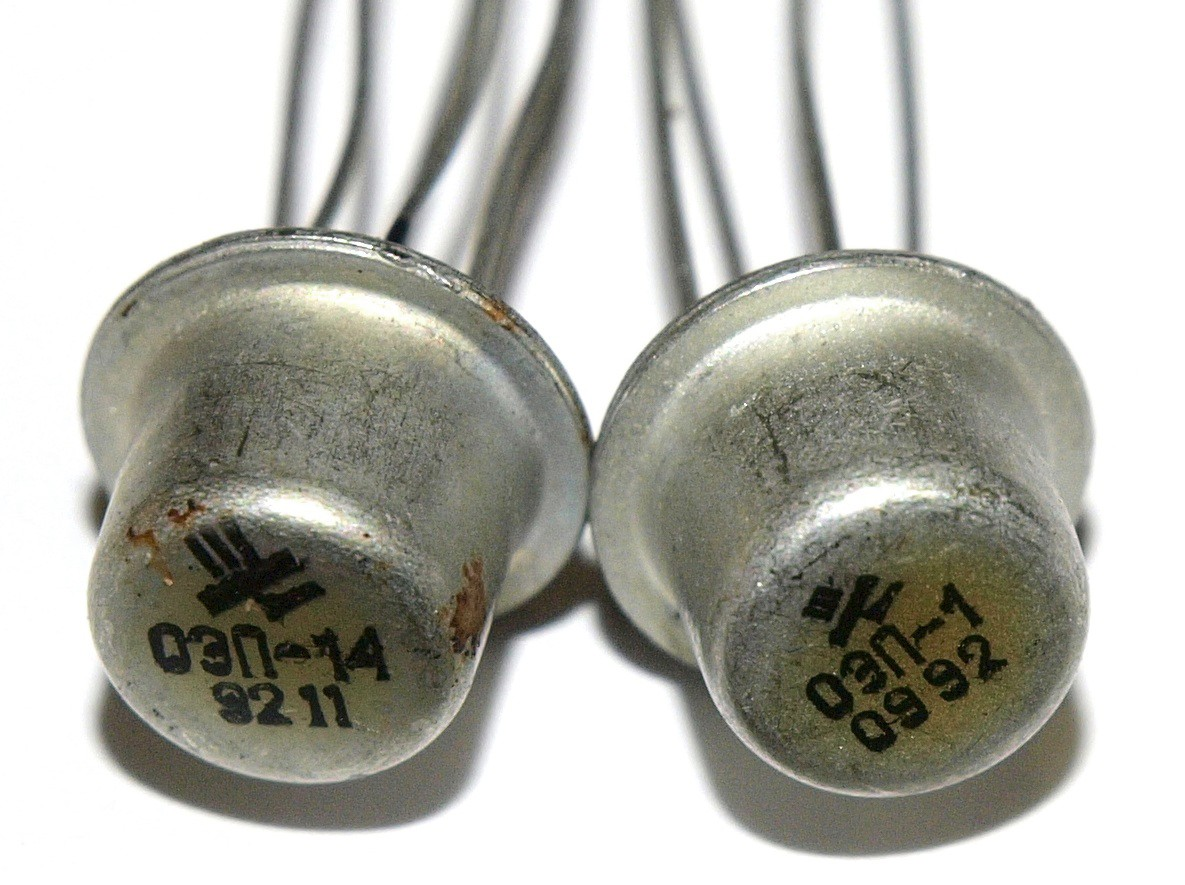
Such metal-case Soviet ROs could be operated between −60 and 55 °C; nominal operating lifetime 2,000 hours due to the incandescent light source

Irreversible degradation of a photoresistor can be induced by exceeding its maximum specified voltage even for a short period. For high-resistivity devices, this voltage is determined by the leakage currents flowing on the semiconductor surface and varies between 100 and 300 V. For low-resistivity models, the voltage limit is lower and originates from the Joule heating.

The service life of a RO is determined by the lifetime of the light source and the acceptable drift of the parameters of the photoresistor. A typical LED can operate for 10,000 hours, after which its parameters slightly degrade. Its lifetime can be prolonged by limiting the controlling current to half of the maximum value. ROs based on incandescent lamps typically fail after about 20,000 hours, due to the burnout of the spiral, and are more prone to overheating.

Degradation of the photoresistor is gradual and irreversible. If the operating temperature does not exceed the limit (typically 75 °C or less) then for each year of continuous operation, the dark resistance falls by 10%; at higher temperature such changes can occur within minutes. The maximum power dissipated in the photoresistor is usually specified for 25 °C and decreases by 2% for every °C of heating.

Cooling below −25 °C sharply increases the response time of a photoresistor. These changes are reversible unless the cooling induces cracking in the plastic components. Soviet ROs packed in metal cases could withstand even at −60 °C, but at these temperatures their response time reached 4 seconds.

== Applications ==
=== AC relay ===
Highly resistive ROs can be operated at AC voltages exceeding 200 V and used as low-power AC or DC relays, e.g., to control electroluminescent indicators.

=== Simple voltage dividers ===
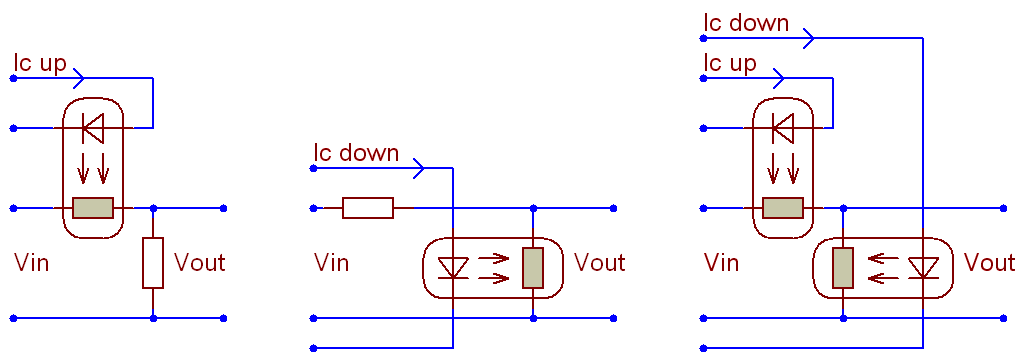
Series, shunt and series-shunt voltage dividers. Series-shunt divider requires two drive signals (I_{C UP} and I_{C DOWN}).

In the simplest output-limiting circuits, the RO is placed in the top (series connection) or lower (shunt) arm of the voltage divider. The series connection provides a greater controlling range (−80 dB) at DC and low frequencies. The operation is complicated by the nonlinearity of the resistance vs. the controlling current. The narrowing of the dynamic range due to the parasitic capacitance is significant at frequencies as low as hundreds of Hz. The reaction is significantly faster to the increase than decrease in the controlling current.

The shunt connection results in smoother transfer characteristics and lower signal distortions, but also in a lower modulation range (−60 dB). This limitation is lifted by connecting two shunt dividers in series, which keeps the transfer characteristic smooth. The best combination of a smooth transfer characteristic, low distortion, wide range of adjustment, and nearly equal rates of increase and decrease of the transmission coefficient is achieved in a series-parallel circuit composed of two ROs and a series resistor. The frequency response of such circuit is similar to that of the series connection.

=== Precision voltage dividers ===
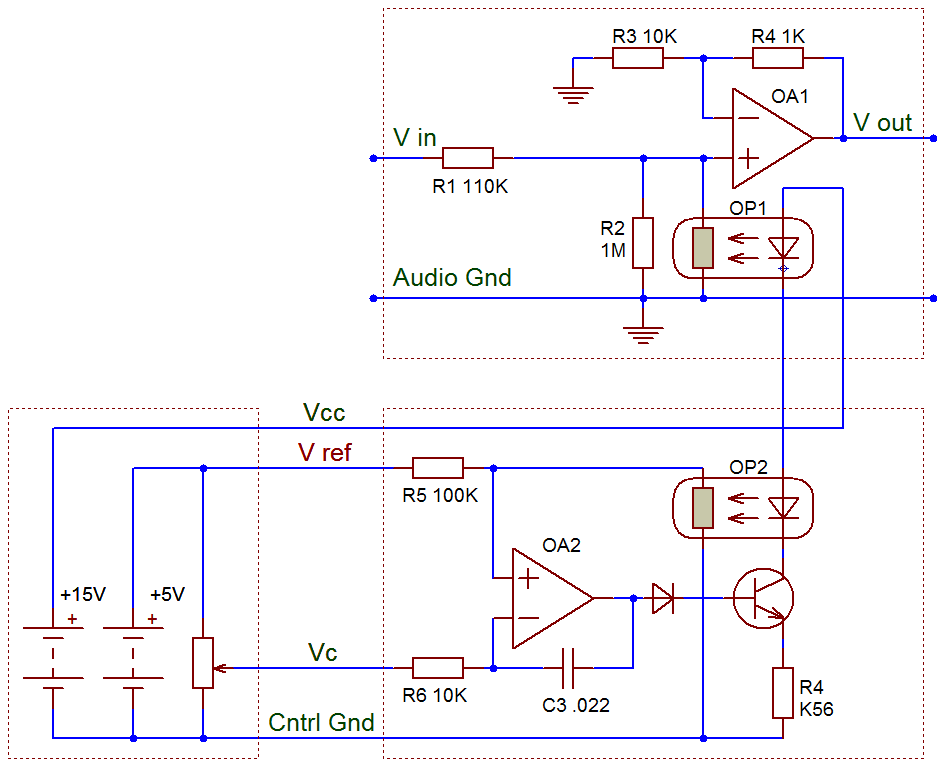
Precision variable-gain buffer stage with linear control law. Maximum gain can be increased by increasing the value of R4. (Note: The original schematic had a common ground wire for audio and control networks. Here, grounds are split to demonstrate full galvanic isolation. The original Silonex circuit used dual supply rails to power OA2. If the inputs of OA2 allow rail-to-rail operation, it can powered with a single positive rail V_{cc}, and the same rail can double as reference voltage (V_{ref}=V_{cc}). It need not be precisely regulated.)

Circuits with defined control voltage of the divider can compensate for the thermal drift of the LED in a RO, but not for the memory effect and thermal drift of the photoresistor. The latter compensation requires a second (reference) photoresistor, which is illuminated by the same light intensity, at the same temperature as the main (modulating) device. Best compensation is achieved when both photoresistors are formed on the same semiconductor chip. The reference photoresistor is included in a divider of stabilized voltage or in a measuring bridge. The error amplifier compares the voltage at the middle point of the divider with the target value and adjusts the controlling current. In the linear controlling regime the RO becomes an analog multiplier: the current through the photoresistor is proportional to the product of the voltage across the photoresistor and the control voltage.

=== Automatic control circuits ===
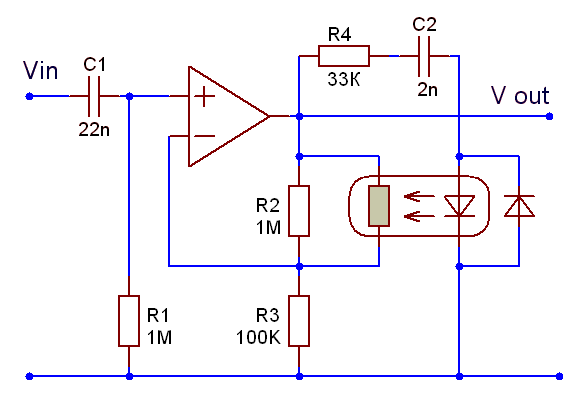
Basic 20dB automatic gain cell used in long-distance telephony in the 1970s.

In the Soviet Union, ROs were used for signal compression in long-distance telephony. The incandescent lamp of the RO was connected to the output of the operational amplifier, and the photoresistor was part of a voltage divider in the feedback circuit of a non-inverting amplifier. Depending on the output voltage, the gain of the circuit varied from 1:1 to 1:10. Similar circuits are still used in professional audio equipment (compressors, limiters and noise suppressors).

ROs produced by the General Electric are used in AC voltage stabilizers. These stabilizers are based on an autotransformer that is controlled by two sets of thyristor stacks. The incandescent lamp of RO is protected by a ballast resistor and is connected to the AC output. The lamp averages the output voltage, suppressing spikes and sine distortions originating from the main. The photoresistor of the RO is included in one arm of the measuring bridge, generating the error signal for the feedback loop.

=== Guitar amplifiers ===
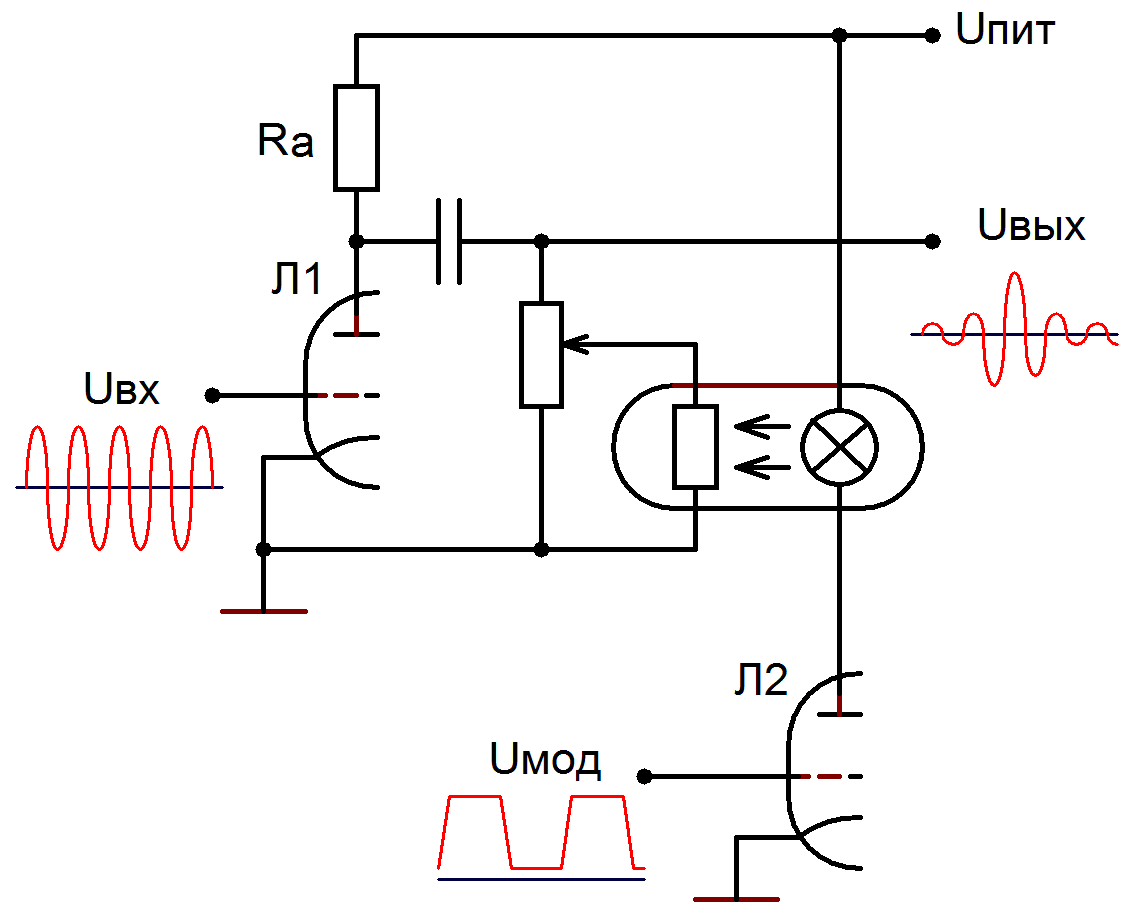
Simplified circuit of a guitar amplifier modulator, employing a RO with an incandescent lamp by Gibson

The first guitar amplifier with a tremolo effect was produced by Fender in 1955. In that amplifier, the tremolo generator controlled the bias of an amplifier cascade located near the output circuit, and its harmonics were leaking to the output signal. In the early 1960s, Fender and Gibson used a RO as a modulator. Its photoresistor was connected via a blocking capacitor and a controlling potentiometer between the output of the preamplifier and the earth, and shunted the preamplifier when triggered. In this scheme, the control signal did not leak to the output. Modulation depth was regulated by a low-impedance potentiometer placed on the front panel. The potentiometer significantly reduced the gain of the previous stage, and thus the preamplifier had to have reserves by amplification.

In their ROs, Gibson used incandescent lamps, which required relatively large currents. Fender replaced them with neon lamps, which increased the modulation frequency and reduced the controlling currents. However, in contrast to the continuous modulation by Gibson, Fender used the on/off switching mode that resulted in less pleasant sound. For this reason, other producers like Univibe preferred incandescent lamps.

By 1967 most producers of guitar amplifiers changed from vacuum tubes to transistors and therefore redesigned their circuits. For several years, Gibson continued to use ROs in transistor amplifiers for the tremolo effect. In 1973, they designed another RO-based control circuit, where a signal from a pedal or an external generator seamlessly connected a diode-based signal stabilizer. However, in the same year they abandoned ROs in favor of field-effect transistors.

=== Analog synthesizers ===
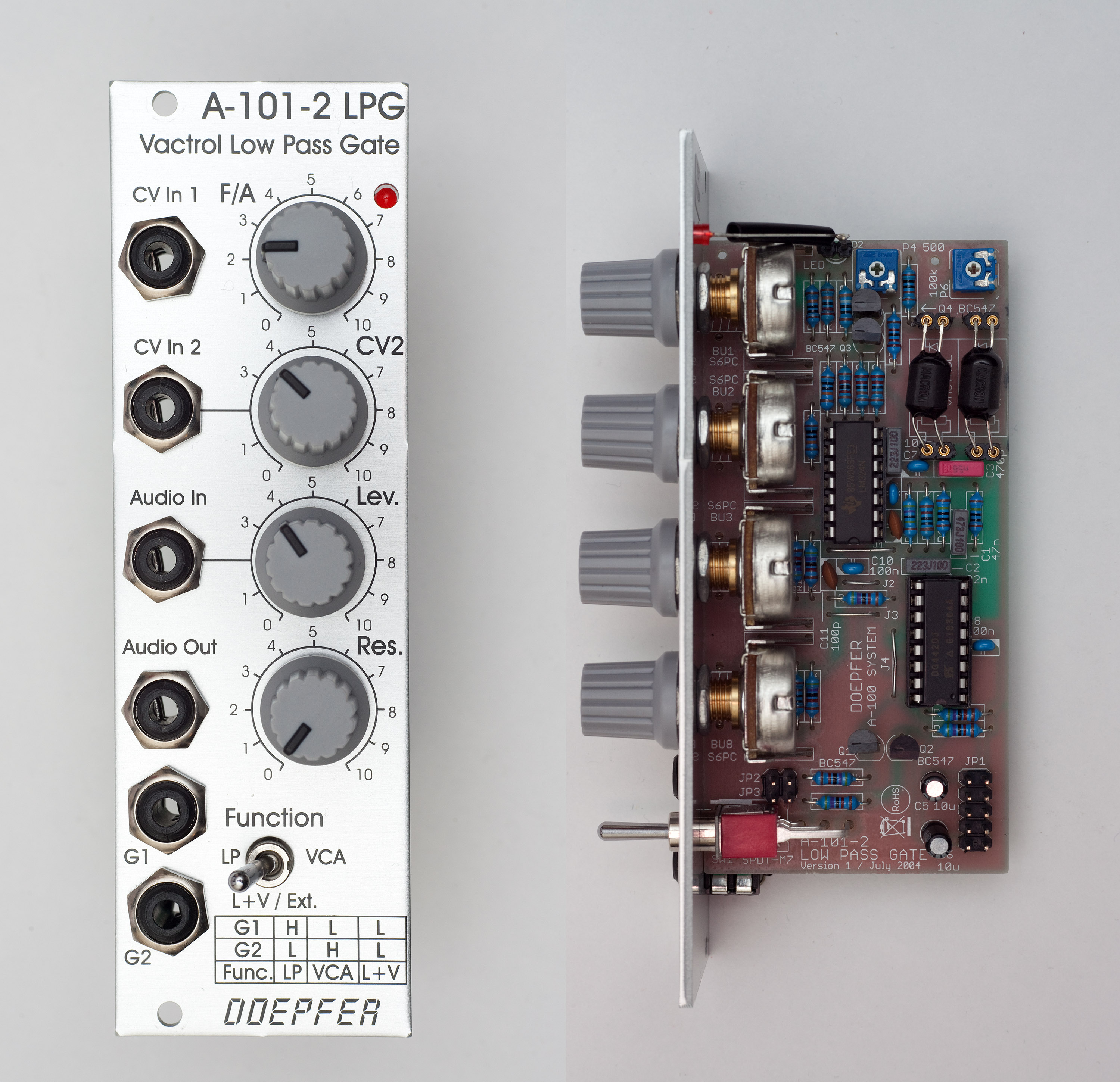
A Doepfer A-101-2 Vactrol Low Pass Gate

RO is a simple and convenient tool for tuning the frequency of oscillators, filters and amplifiers in analog synthesizers. Particularly simple is their implementation in the voltage-controlled RC filters in a Sallen-Key topology, where the RO provides a nearly exponential dependence of the cutoff frequency on the controlling current, without using feedback by the modulation signal. However, due to the slow response of ROs, most synthesizer developers of the 1970s and 1980s, such as ARP, Korg, Moog and Roland, preferred other elements. (Note: Synthesizers of the 1970s–1980s often utilized changes in the dynamic resistance or/and inverse capacitance of p-n junctions, in diode-capacitance filters with a regulated positive feedback (Moog, APR). Korg used conventional Sallen-Key filters where ROs were replaced by inversed bipolar transistors.) As of August 2013 RO-based synthesizers are produced by Doepfer (Germany). A still popular use for ROs are Lowpass Gates like the 292 by Buchla Electronic Musical Instruments, the Plan B Model 13 and Make Noise MMG.

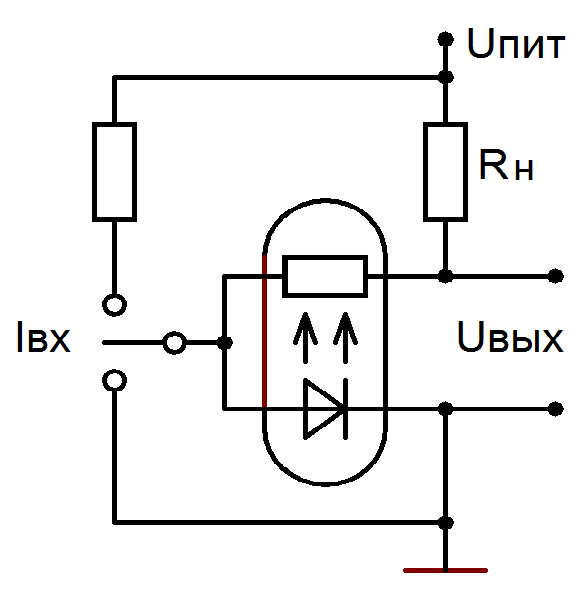
RO-based memory cell, which assumes the "high" or "low" state after a brief commutation of the input tumbler from the middle to the upper or lower position.

=== Triggers ===
Series connection of an LED (Note: ROs based on incandescent lamps are unsuitable for relays because of the combination of a high controlling current and high output resistance) and a low-resistance photoresistor make the RO a trigger (memory cell) which can be controlled by current pulses. In transparent ROs, the state of such cell can be monitored visually by the LED emission.

=== Radio communication ===
Vactrols have been used as remote-controlled resistors for precise ground termination of Beverage and Ewe type antennas. In a typical ham radio setup, the vactrol is placed in the termination box at the farthest point of the antenna. The LDR modifies total resistance between antenna and ground (termination resistance); the operator fine-tunes this resistor from his radio shack by varying the vactrol's LED or bulb current with a potentiometer. Tuning with vactrols improves directional cardioid pattern of the antenna. According to Connelly, vactrols are superior to traditional resistors in this function. In this simple layout, the LED or bulb of the vactrol is prone to damage by voltage surges induced by lightning, and must be protected by a pair of neon lamps acting as gas dischargers.

== Bibliography ==
- Bennett, S (1993). A history of control engineering, 1930–1955. London: Peter Peregrinus Ltd. / IET. p. 21. ISBN 0863412998.
- Fielding, R (1974). Technological history of motion pictures and television. Berkeley and Los Angeles, CA: University of California Press. ISBN 0520004116.
- Kriksunov, L. Z. (1978). Справочник по основам инфракрасной техники. Moscow: Советское радио. pp. 230–336, 247–274.
- PerkinElmer (2001). Photoconductive Cells and Analog Optoisolators (Vactrols) (PDF). St. Louis, MO: PerkinElmer Optoelectronics.
- Pikhtin, A. N. (2001). Оптическая и квантовая электроника. Moscow: Высшая школа. pp. 262–271, 401–424, 534–545. ISBN 5060027031.
- "Audio level control with resistive optocouplers" (PDF). Silonex. 2002. Archived from the original (PDF) on February 21, 2010.
- "The Raysistor" (PDF). Raytheon Technologies. 1964. Archived from the original (PDF) on 2021-10-15.
- Weber, G (1997). Tube Amp Talk for the Guitarist and Tech. Milwaukee, MN: Hal Leonard Corporation. ISBN 0964106019.
- Yushchin, A. V. (1998). Оптоэлектронные приборы и их зарубежные аналоги, том 1. Moscow: Радиософт. ISBN 5-93037-042-7.
- Zvorykin, V.G.; Wilson, E. D. (1934). Photocells and their application. 2nd edition: New York: J. Wiley and sons; London: Chapman and Hall.
