= Moog Mother-32 =

Semi-modular analogue synthesizer

Mother-32
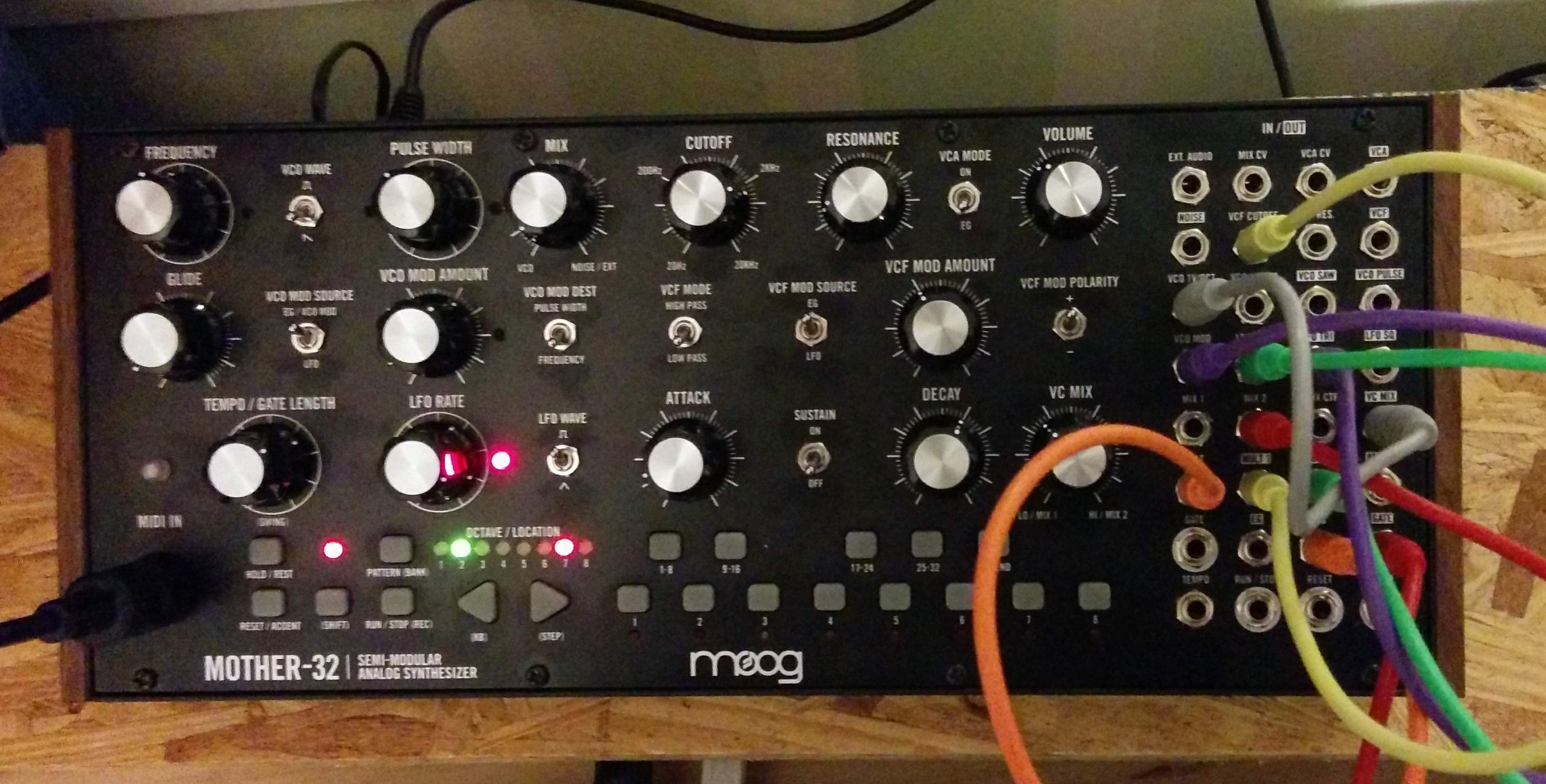
- Manufacturer: Moog
- Dates: Oct 2015
- Price: Original MSRP $679

Technical specifications
- Polyphony: Monophonic
- Oscillator: 1, Sawtooth and pulse (PWM)
- LFO: Triangle and square, 0.1 to 600 Hz
- Synthesis type: Analog
- Filter: Low Pass, High Pass Ladder Filter 20Hz-20kHz

Input/output
- Keyboard: 13 note

The Mother-32 is a semi-modular analog synthesizer. Introduced in 2015, it was the first tabletop unit produced by Moog Music. It has a single voltage controlled audio oscillator, a voltage controlled low frequency oscillator, a voltage controlled filter switchable between high and low pass, an AR envelope generator with switchable sustain, a voltage controlled amplifier, and a white noise generator. It also features a 32–step monophonic sequencer, a 13-note keypad, and a 32-point patch bay including assignable outputs. The Mother-32 is manufactured in Asheville, North Carolina.

== Expandability ==
The unit has a MIDI input and CV outputs, and can act as a MIDI-to-CV converter. The Mother-32 can also be integrated into a Eurorack skiff or case. Moog also produces 2- and 3-tier racks for mounting multiple Moog Mother-32s, DFAMs (Drummer From Another Mother), Labyrinths, Spectravox, or Subharmonicons.

== Construction ==
The Mother-32 case is constructed from aluminum with wooden sides.

== See also ==
- List of Moog synthesizer players
- Moog synthesizer
- Robert Moog
