= Elektor Formant =

DIY music synthesizer design

The Elekfor Formant synthesizer was a DIY modular synthesizer whose design was published in Elektor, a magazine for electronics hobbyists, starting in 1977. It was designed by Cyril Chapman. The complete design was published as a book in 1979.

The Formant had a similar set of modules to a Moog modular synthesizer. A typical Formant setup included three VCOs, two VCFs, dual VCAs, one or more ADSR envelope generators, an LFO module and a noise source.
