= Doepfer MS-404 =

MIDI analog synthesiser

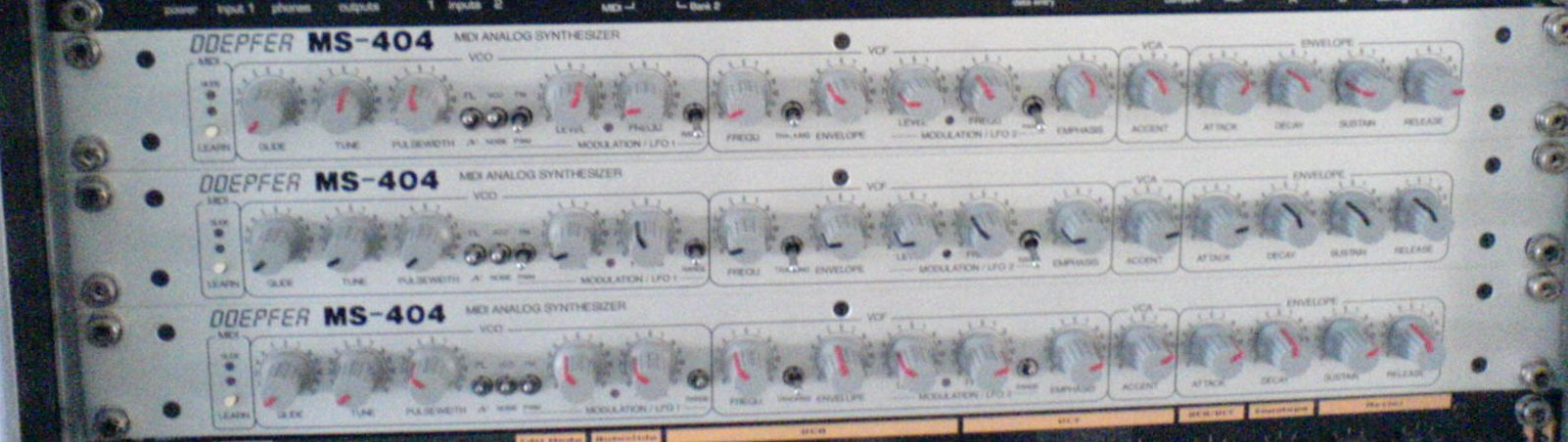
Three Doepfer MS-404 in a rack. Version 1 is in the middle, Version 2 are on top and bottom.

The Doepfer MS-404 is a MIDI analog synthesizer made by the German audio manufacturer Doepfer.

== History ==
In summer 1994 Dieter Doepfer's main intention was to create an analog synth for his personal pleasure and he created a simple clone of the Roland TB-303. The MS-404 launched in December 1994. It was a monophonic MIDI controlled analog synthesizer with a 24db resonant filter. At first, 50 to 100 items were planned for the market launch, but then they received almost 500 orders in the first two months in 1995. At the end of 1997 Doepfer had sold 3000 items. Also in 1997 approximately 100 limited edition synths (featuring a green faceplate) were sold as a 25th anniversary special for Music Store of Cologne, Germany. The last MS-404 was sold in March 2001, as the amount of inquiries was falling (from 100 items per month to hardly 10 items per month at the end of 2000). Doepfer still offers technical support for the unit.
