= Doepfer A-100 =

Modular synthesizer, introduced the Eurorack standard

A-100
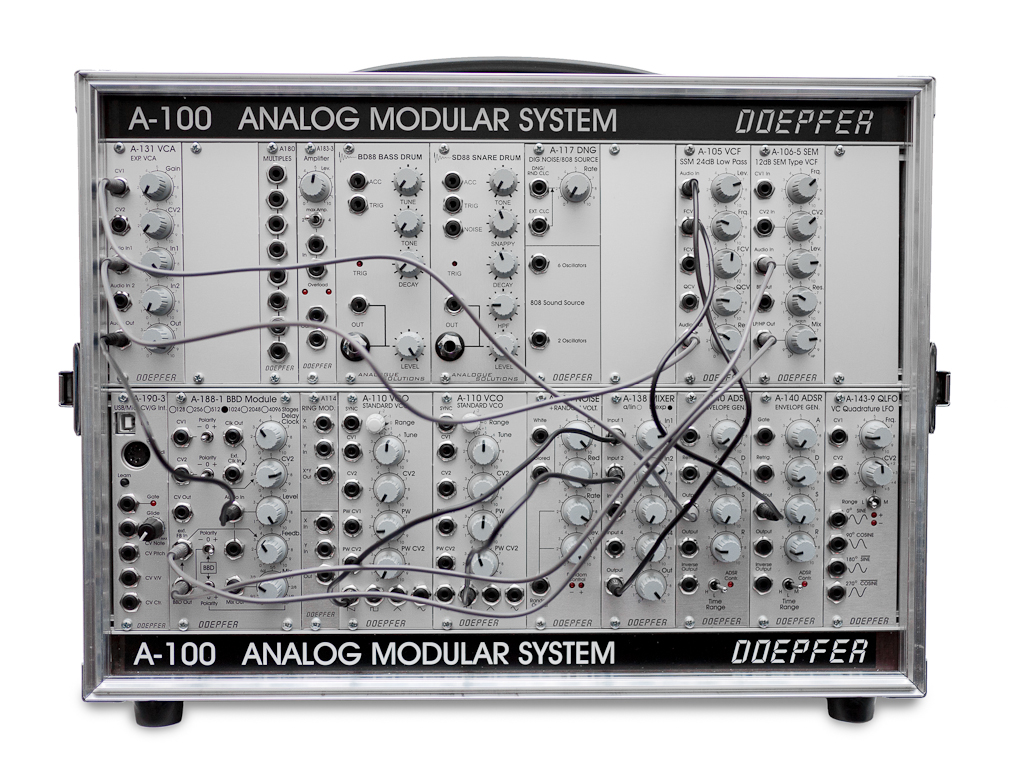
- A Doepfer A-100 in a P6 suitcase enclosure
- Manufacturer: Doepfer
- Dates: 1995 - present

Technical specifications
- Synthesis type: Subtractive
- Effects: DSP (A-187-1 module)

Input/output
- Keyboard: Optional
- External control: Optional (USB, MIDI, CV/gate)

Example piece of music performed entirely on a Doepfer A-100

The Doepfer A-100 is an analog modular synthesizer system introduced by German audio manufacturer Doepfer in 1995. Although there were only 10 module types at time of release, it currently has more than 120 modules plus several different enclosures and accessories.

== Design ==
A-100 modules are designed to be rack-mounted, each being 3U tall and a multiple of 2HP wide, and a variety of cases are available to house them. This type of racking system, Eurorack, has been adopted by many other manufacturers of synthesiser modules. Modules are patched using standard mono miniature (3.5 mm) leads. This combination of 3U height, multiples of 2HP width, and 3.5 mm leads is known more generally as the Eurorack standard, and is in contrast to the older combination of 5U height and 6.35 mm width pioneered by Moog.

Other companies such as Analogue Solutions, Analogue Systems, Roland, Moog and Cwejman have also adopted the Eurorack standard, making it relatively easy to integrate their modules into each other's systems.

== Example uses ==
Using certain modules designed specifically for the purpose, it is possible to use the A-100 system to emulate a Trautonium or a Theremin, as well as to use it as a vocoder.

== Modules ==
The following modules have been, or are still being, manufactured by Doepfer:

- A-101-1 – Vactrol multimode filter
- A-101-2 – Vactrol low-pass filter / VCA
- A-101-3 – 12 stage vactrol phaser
- A-101-6 – Six Stage Opto FET VCF
- A-101-9 – Dual universal vactrol module
- A-102 – EMS VCS 3 style 18 dB/octave diode low-pass filter
- A-103 – Roland TB-303 style 18 dB/octave transistor ladder low-pass filter
- A-104 – Trautonium style formant filter
- A-105 – 24 dB/octave SSM2044 based 24 dB/octave low-pass filter
- A-105-4 – Quad Poly VCF
- A-106-1 – Korg MS-20 style 12 dB/octave low-pass / 6 dB/octave high-pass filter
- A-106-5 – Oberheim SEM style 12 dB/octave multimode filter
- A-106-6 – Oberheim Xpander style multimode filter
- A-107 – Oberheim Xpander style multimode filter
- A-108 – 6, 12, 24, and 48 dB/octave low-pass / band-pass transistor ladder filter
- A-109 – Signal processor
- A-110-1 – Standard VCO
- A-110-2 – Basic VCO
- A-110-4 – Thru zero quadrature VCO
- A-110-6 – Trapezoid Thru Zero Quadrature VCO
- A-111-1 – High end VCO
- A-111-2 – High End VCO II / VCLFO
- A-111-3 – Micro Precision VCO / VCLFO
- A-111-4 – Quad Precision VCO
- A-111-5 – Mini synthesizer voice (combination VCO / filter / VCA / LFO / ADSR envelope generator)
- A-112 – Sampler / wavetable oscillator
- A-113 – Trautonium style subharmonic generator
- A-114 – Dual ring modulator
- A-115 – Audio divider
- A-116 – Waveform processor
- A-117 – Digital noise generator / Roland TR-808 style discordant sound source
- A-118 – Analog noise generator / random voltage
- A-118-2 – Analog noise generator / random voltage (Slim Line Series)
- A-119 – External input / envelope follower
- A-120 – Moog style 24 dB/octave low-pass filter
- A-121 – 12 dB/octave multimode filter
- A-121-2 – 12 dB Multimode Filter
- A-122 – Oberheim style 24 dB/octave low-pass filter with CEM 3379 chip
- A-123 – 24 dB/octave high-pass filter
- A-123-2 – 6/12/18/24 dB Highpass Filter
- A-124 – EDP Wasp style 12 dB/octave multimode filter
- A-125 – Phaser
- A-126 – Frequency shifter
- A-127 – Triple resonance filter
- A-127BOM – Filter breakout module
- A-128 – Fixed filter bank
- A-129/1 – Vocoder analysis
- A-129/2 – Vocoder synthesis
- A-129/3 – Vocoder slew limiter
- A-129/4 – Slew limiter controller
- A-129/5 – Voiced/unvoiced detector
- A-130 – Linear VCA
- A-131 – Exponential VCA
- A-132-1 – Dual linear low cost VCA
- A-132-2 – Quad VCA
- A-132-3 – Dual linear / exponential VCA
- A-132-4 – Quad exponential VCA / mixer
- A-132-8 – Octal Poly VCA
- A-133 – Dual polarizer
- A-134-1 – Panner
- A-134-2 – Dual crossfader
- A-135 – Mixer
- A-135-2 – Quad VCA / Mixer
- A-136 – Distortion / waveshaper
- A-137-1 – Wave multiplier I
- A-137-2 – Wave multiplier II
- A-138a – Linear mixer
- A-138b – Exponential mixer
- A-138c – Polarizing mixer
- A-138d – Crossfader / effect insert
- A-138e – Quad three-way crossfader / mixer / polarizer
- A-138m – 4x4 Matrix Mixer
- A-138o – Performance Mixer Output Module
- A-138p – Performance Mixer
- A-138s – Mini Stereo Mixer
- A-138u – Dual Micro Mixer (2x3)
- A-138x – Mixer expander (for use with A-138a or A-138b)
- A-139 – Headphone amplifier
- A-139-2 – Headphone Amplifier
- A-140 – ADSR envelope generator
- A-140-2 – Dual Mini ADSR
- A-141 – Voltage controlled ADSR envelope generator
- A-141-2 – Voltage controlled ADSR / LFO
- A-141-4 – Quad Poly VCADSR
- A-142-1 – Decay envelope generator / gate
- A-142-2 – Dual Envelope Controlled VCA
- A-142-4 – Quad Decay
- A-143-1 – Complex envelope generator / quad AD envelope generator / quad LFO
- A-143-2 – Quad ADSR envelope generator
- A-143-3 – Quad LFO
- A-143-4 – Quad voltage controlled LFO / VCO
- A-143-9 – Quadrature LFO
- A-144 – Morphing controller
- A-145 – LFO I
- A-146 – LFO II
- A-147 – Voltage controlled LFO
- A-147-2 – Voltage Controlled Delayed Low Frequency Oscillator / VCDLFO
- A-148 – Dual sample and hold / track and hold
- A-149-1 – Buchla 200 style quantized random voltages / stored random voltages
- A-149-2 – Eight digital random voltages
- A-150 – Dual voltage controlled switch
- A-150-8 – Octal Manual/Voltage Controlled Programmable Switches
- A-151 – Quad sequential switch
- A-152 – Addressed track and hold / analog shift register / octal switch (multiplexer)
- A-154 – Sequencer controller
- A-155 – Analog / trigger sequencer
- A-156 – Dual quantizer
- A-157 – Trigger Sequencer Subsystem
- A-160 – Clock divider
- A-160-2 – Clock/Trigger Divider II
- A-160-5 – Voltage Controlled Clock Multiplier / Ratcheting Controller
- A-161 – Clock sequencer
- A-162 – Dual trigger delay
- A-163 – Frequency divider
- A-164-1 – Manual gate
- A-165 – Dual trigger inverter
- A-166 – Dual logic gate
- A-167 – Analog comparator / subtractor / offset generator
- A-168-1 – PWM Module
- A-170 – Dual slew limiter
- A-171 – Voltage controlled slew limiter
- A-171-2 – Voltage controlled slew processor / generator
- A-172 – Maximum / minimum selector
- A-173-1/2 – Micro Keyboard / Manual Gate Modules
- A-174-1 – Joystick
- A-174-2 – Wheels
- A-175 – Dual voltage inverter
- A-176 – Manual control voltage source
- A-177-1 – Foot controller I
- A-177-2 – Foot controller II
- A-178 – Theremin style antenna
- A-179 – Light controlled voltage source
- A-180-1 – Multiples I (4HP)
- A-180-2 – Multiples I (2HP)
- A-180-3 – Dual Buffered Multiple
- A-180-9 – Multicore
- A-181 – Multiples II
- A-182 – Switched multiples
- A-183-1 – Dual attenuator
- A-183-2 – Offset generator / attenuator / polarizer
- A-183-3 – Amplifier
- A-183-9 – Quad USB Power Supply
- A-184-1 – Ring Modulator / S&H/T&H / Slew Limiter Combo
- A-184-2 – Voltage Controlled Crossfader / Triangle-to-Sine Waveshaper
- A-185-1 – Bus access
- A-185-2 – Precision adder
- A-186-1 – Gate/trigger combiner
- A-187-1 – DSP effects
- A-188-1 – BBD
- A-188-2 – Tapped BBD
- A-189-1 – Bit modifier
- A-190-1 – MIDI to CV/gate/sync interface
- A-190-2 – MIDI to CV/gate interface
- A-190-3 – USB/MIDI to CV/gate interface
- A-190-4 – USB/MIDI to CV/gate/sync interface
- A-190-5 – Polyphonic USB/MIDI to CV/gate interface
- A-190-8 – USB/MIDI to sync interface
- A-191 – MIDI to CV interface / shephard generator
- A-192-1 – CV to MIDI interface
- A-192-2 – CV/gate to MIDI/USB interface
- A-196 – Phase-locked loop
- A-197-1 – VU meter
- A-197-2 – LCD oscilloscope
- A-198 – Trautonium style ribbon controller
- A-199 – Spring reverb

== Notable users ==
- Angelspit
- Autechre
- Ian Boddy
- Deadmau5
- Chris Carter
- John Frusciante
- Gus Gus
- James Holden
- The Human League
- Infected Mushroom
- Kraftwerk
- A R Rahman
- Trent Reznor
- Mark Shreeve
- Hans Zimmer
