= Doepfer =

German audio hardware manufacturer

Doepfer Musikelektronik GmbH is a German manufacturer of audio hardware, mostly modular synthesizers, based in Gräfelfing, Upper Bavaria, Germany and founded by Dieter Döpfer. The product range covers analog modular systems, MIDI controllers, MIDI hardware sequencers, MIDI-to-CV/Gate/Sync Interfaces, MIDI master keyboards and special MIDI equipment. They are also known for the creation of the Eurorack form factor for synthesizers.

Dieter Döpfer began developing audio hardware with a Voltage Controlled Phaser module for the Formant, a do-it-yourself-kit analog synthesizer from Elektor magazine in 1977. Several legendary modular synths followed while Döpfer also focused on the development of MIDI equipment during the 1980s.

In 1992, Doepfer Musikelektronik GmbH released the MIDI analog sequencer MAQ16/3 which was designed in cooperation with Kraftwerk. In the beginning, the company had direct sales and interested musicians would receive a demonstration by visiting other customers since the modular systems were deemed too difficult for typical music shop employees to demonstrate. Facing greater publicity, Doepfer shifted the distribution to specialized points of sales.

== Product History ==
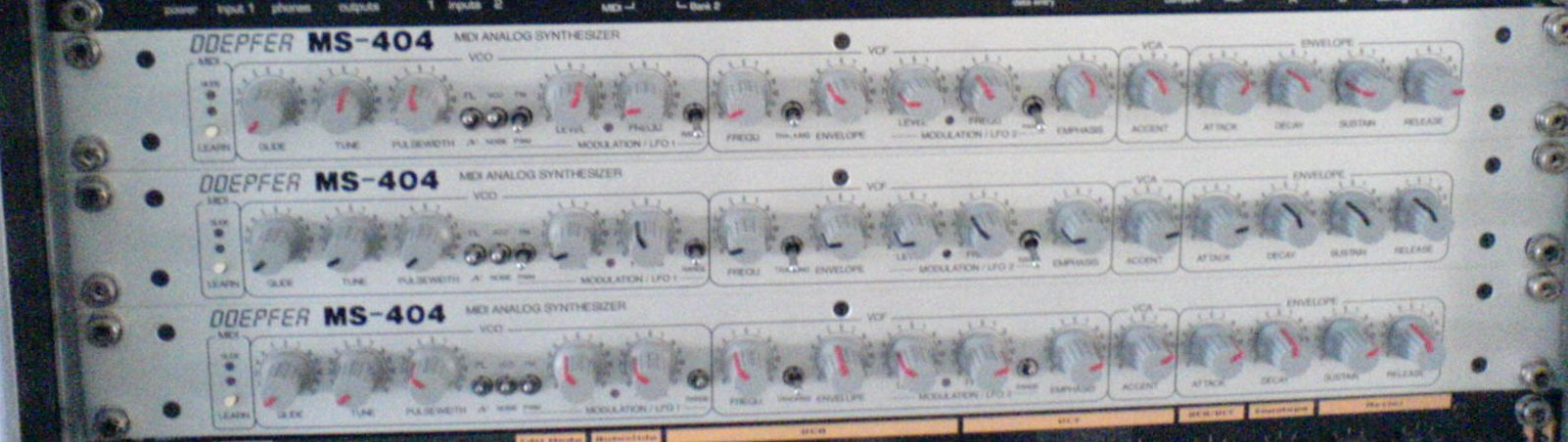
Doepfer MS-404 Synthesizer

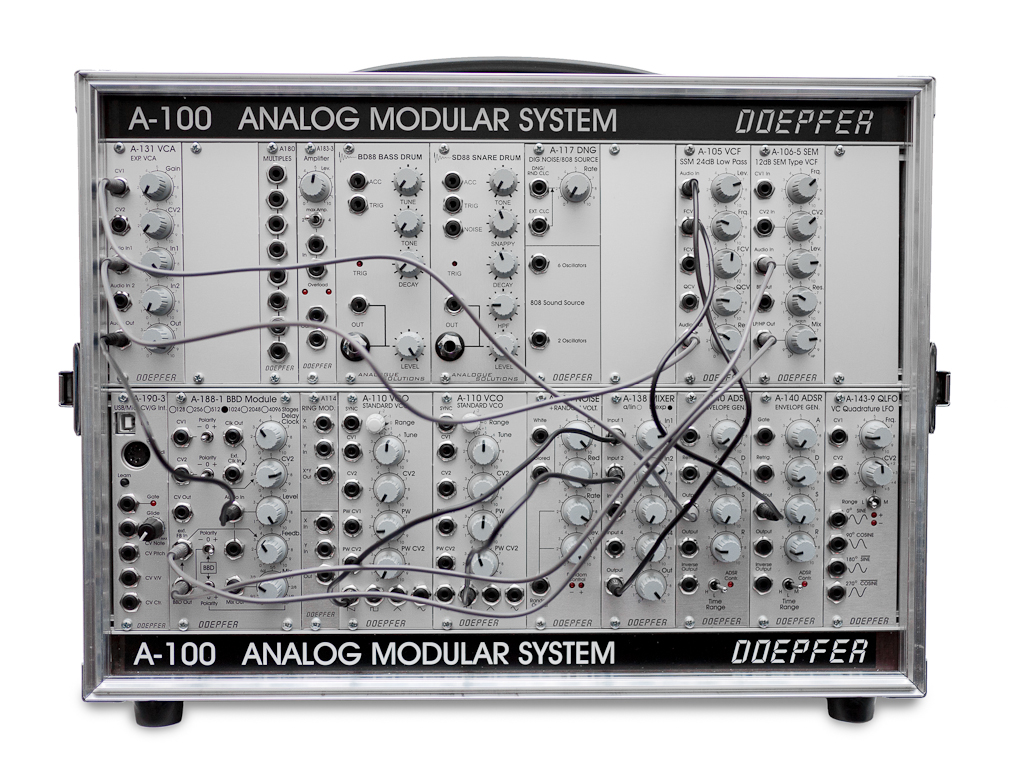
Doepfer A-100 Synthesizer

- 1979 Voltage controlled phaser module for the German Formant modular synthesizer
- 1980 PMS Polyphonic modular system (quad-modules, like quad-VCO, quad-VCF...)
- 1982 Voice modular system (one synthesizer voice with 2 VCOs, 2ADSR, 1VCF, 1VCA on one board 100x160mm, designed with CEM chips from Doug Curtis/USA)
- 1984 Sound Sampler (8 bit voltage controlled sampler with interface and sampling software for Commodore 64)
- 1985 Loop option, compander and synthesis software for sound sampler (FM, Fourier, Waveshaping and so on)
- 1986 MCV1 MIDI-to-CV interface (first version)
- 1987 CCM Computer-controlled audio mixing console with computer-controlled faders (VCAs) and filters (VCFs), interface and software for Commodore 64 and Atari ST
- 1989
  - LMK1 simple MIDI master keyboard
  - MMK2 MIDI keyboard (e.g. used by Kraftwerk live for the Pocket Calculator song)
  - MKC1/2 MIDI master keyboard controller (for combination with LMK1)
- 1990
  - LMK3 MIDI master keyboard with piano touch simulation
  - LMK1V2 MIDI master keyboard (improved version of LMK1)
  - SX-16 16 voice MIDI expander
  - MBP1 MIDI Bass pedal
  - DMC-8 Drum to MIDI converter
  - MONA universal MIDI out interface
- 1991
  - K2B 2 manual MIDI keyboard
  - MPC128 MIDI program change unit
  - MTG128 MIDI-to-Gate interface with up to 128 Gate outputs controlled via MIDI
  - MTS128 MIDI-to-Switch interface with up to 128 MIDI controlled electronic switches (e.g. as MIDI-In interface for any non-MIDI-keyboard)
- 1992
  - LMK1+/LMK2+/LMK4+ MIDI master keyboard series with real hammer mechanics
  - GMX-1 GM compatible MIDI expander
  - MAQ16/3 MIDI analog sequencer (designed in cooperation with Kraftwerk)
- 1993
  - MIDIM8 MIDI controller dimmer pack with 8 power outputs
  - MTP8 MIDI switch-pack with 8 power outputs
  - MVP1 MIDI volume foot controller
- 1994
  - LMK4+ MIDI master keyboard top model
  - MOGLI MIDI glove
  - MEG universal MIDI event generator
  - MTR128 MIDI to relays interface to control up to 128 relays via MIDI note on/off
  - MSY1 MIDI-to-SYNC interface
- 1995
  - MS-404 monophonic analog MIDI synthesizer
  - TMK2 2 manual MIDI master keyboard
  - A-100 analog modular system
- 1997
  - Schaltwerk MIDI pattern sequencer
  - MCV4 MIDI-to-CV interface
  - MSY2 MIDI-to-SYNC interface
- 1998
  - Regelwerk MIDI fader box and pattern/analog sequencer
  - PK88 MIDI Keyboard (control keyboard especially for piano expanders)
  - MCV24 MIDI-to-CV/Gate interface (24 CV/Gate outputs)
- c.1999 Drehbank MIDI controller
- c.2000 Pocket Control MIDI controller
- 2006
  - Thru-Zero Quadrature VCO
  - 30/60dB Switched Capacitor Filter
  - A-100 Keyboard/Sequencer
- 2010 Dark Energy Mono Synth
- 2011 Dark Time Analog Sequencer
- 2012 Dark Energy II Mono Synth
