= Sampler (musical instrument) =

Device that records and plays back samples

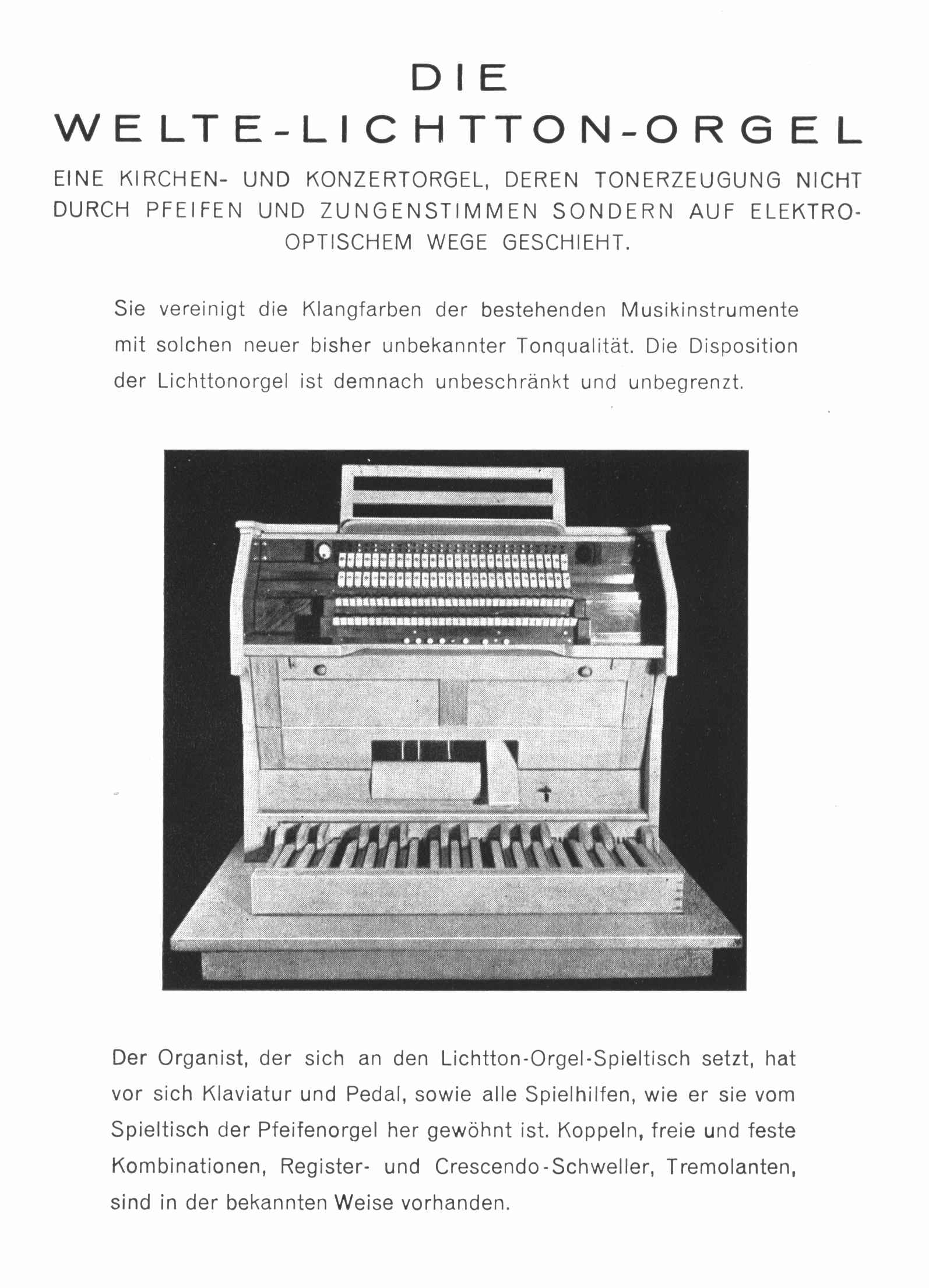
Lichttonorgel (1936),
an earlier sampling organ utilizing analog optical disc

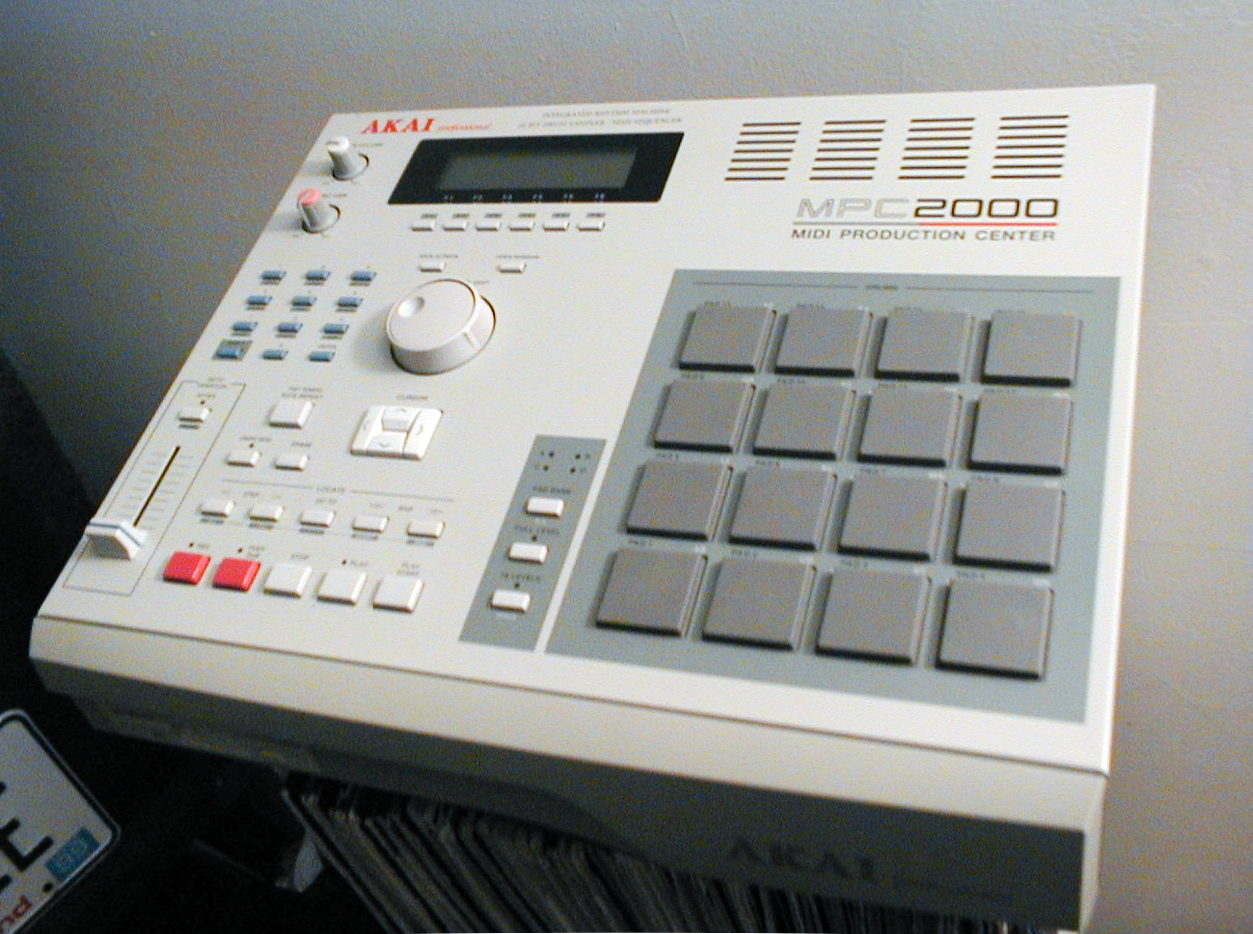
An Akai MPC2000 sampling sequencer (1997)

A sampler is an electronic musical instrument that records and plays back samples (portions of sound recordings). Samples may comprise elements such as rhythm, melody, speech, sound effects or longer portions of music.

The mid-20th century saw the introduction of keyboard instruments that played sounds recorded on tape, such as the Mellotron. As technology improved, cheaper standalone samplers with more memory emerged, such as the E-mu Emulator, Akai S950 and Akai MPC.

Samples may be loaded or recorded by the user or by a manufacturer. The samples can be played back by means of the sampler program itself, a MIDI keyboard, sequencer or another triggering device (e.g., electronic drums). Because these samples are usually stored in digital memory, the information can be quickly accessed. A single sample may be pitch-shifted to different pitches to produce musical scales and chords.

Often samplers offer filters, effects units, modulation via low frequency oscillation and other synthesizer-like processes that allow the original sound to be modified in many different ways. Most samplers have Multitimbrality capabilities – they can play back different sounds simultaneously. Many are also polyphonic – they are able to play more than one note at the same time.

== History ==
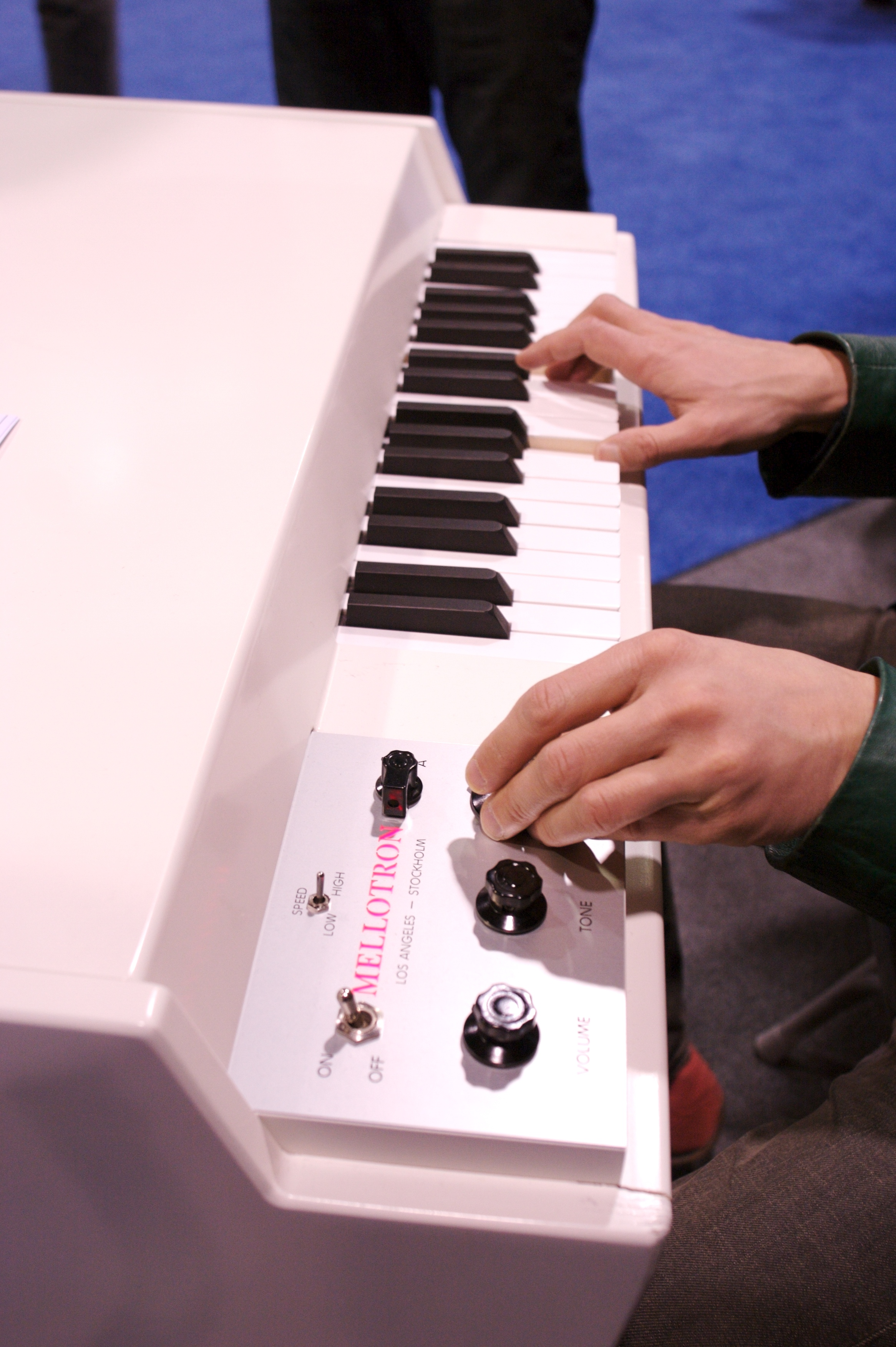
Mellotron (Introduced 1963)

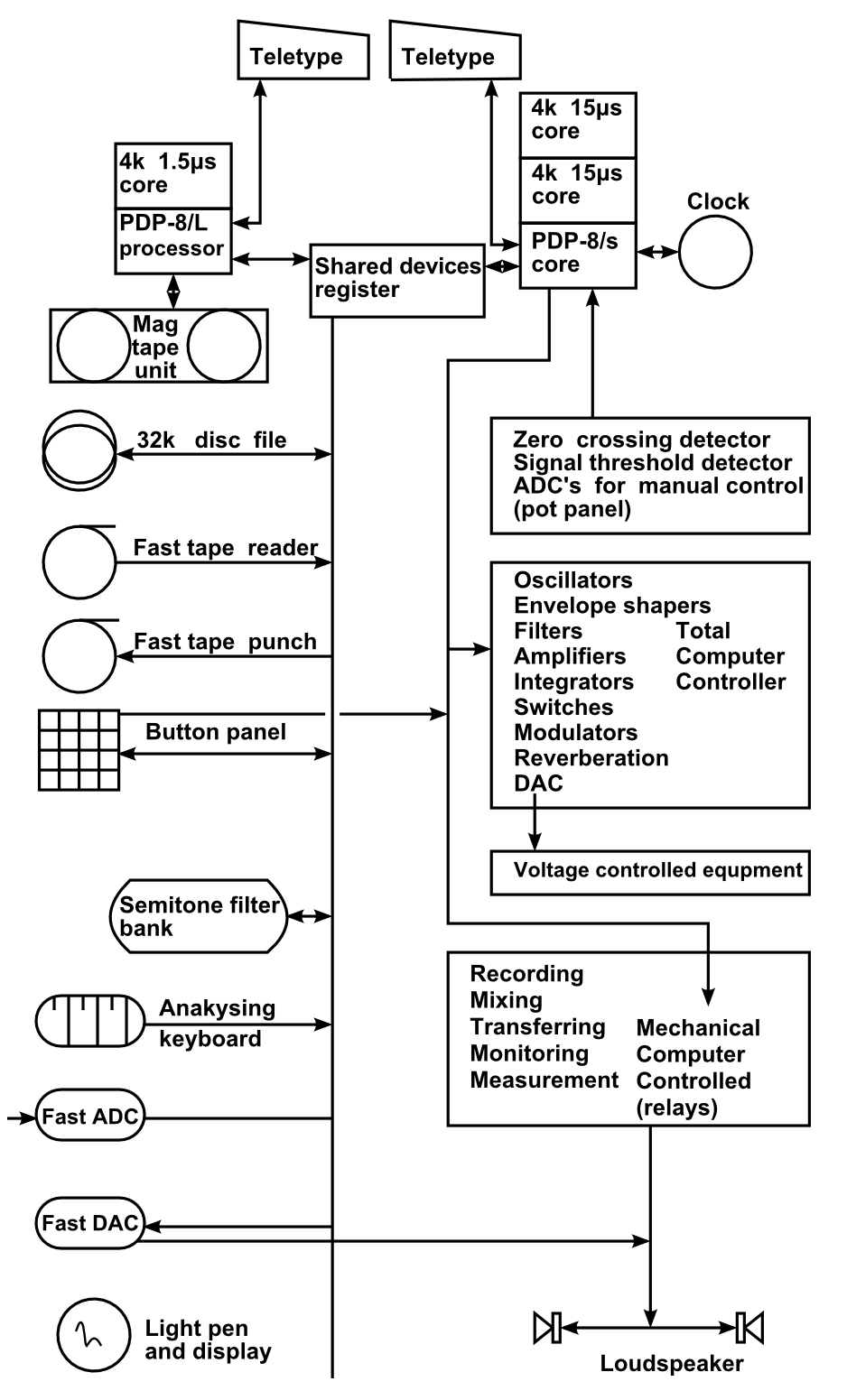
EMS MUSYS-3 (1970) (based on Nunzio 2014)

Prior to computer memory-based samplers, musicians used tape replay keyboards, which store recordings on analog tape. When a key is pressed the tape head contacts the moving tape and plays a sound. The Mellotron was the most notable model, used by a number of groups in the late 1960s and the 1970s, but such systems were expensive and heavy due to the multiple tape mechanisms involved, and the range of the instrument was limited to three octaves at the most. To change sounds a new set of tapes had to be installed in the instrument. The emergence of the digital sampler made sampling far more practical.

The earliest digital sampling was done on the EMS Musys system, developed by Peter Grogono (software), David Cockerell (hardware and interfacing) and Peter Zinovieff (system design and operation) at their London (Putney) Studio c. 1969. The system ran on two mini-computers, Digital Equipment PDP-8's. These had a pair of fast D/A and A/D converters, 12,000 (12k) bytes of core memory (RAM), backed up by a hard drive of 32k and by tape storage (DecTape). EMS equipment was used to control the world's first digital studio (EMS London (Putney) Studio), and their earliest digital sampling was done on that system during 1971–1972 for Harrison Birtwistle's "Chronometer" released in 1975.

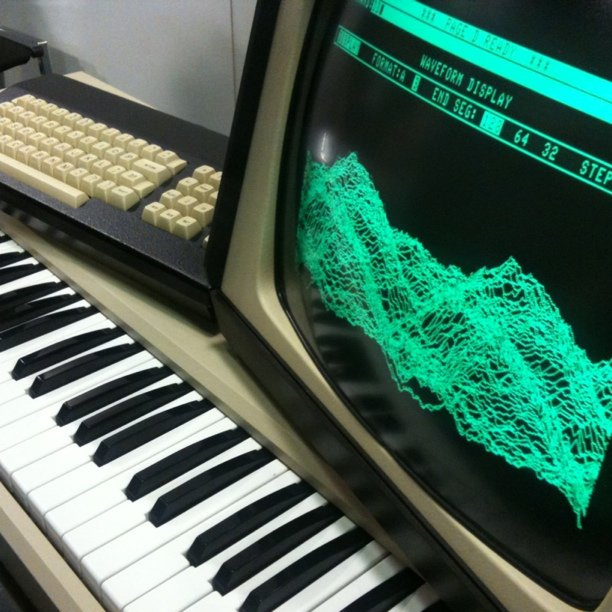
Fairlight CMI (1979)

The first commercially available sampling synthesizer was the Computer Music Melodian by Harry Mendell (1976), while the first polyphonic digital sampling synthesizer was the Australian-produced Fairlight CMI, first available in 1979. These early sampling synthesizers used wavetable sample-based synthesis. The Fairlight CMI played and recorded low quality samples at 8-bit audio depth and 8–24 kHz sampling rate.

In 1981, Toshiba introduced the LMD-649 in Japan. It was an early digital sampler that played and recorded high quality pulse-code modulation (PCM) samples at 12-bit audio depth and 50 kHz sampling rate, stored in 128 KB of dynamic RAM. It was created by engineer Kenji Murata for Japanese electronic music band Yellow Magic Orchestra, who used it for extensive sampling and looping in their 1981 album Technodelic. The LMD-649 was also used by other Japanese synthpop artists in the early 1980s, including Chiemi Manabe and Logic System.

Sampling keyboards were notable for their high price which was out of reach for the majority of working musicians – with the early Fairlight starting at $30,000. The E-mu Emulator brought the price down to under $10,000 but it was not until the mid-1980s that genuinely affordable keyboard samplers began to hit the market with the Ensoniq Mirage in 1985 and the E-mu Emax the following year, which had a sub-$2000 price point. The Korg DSS-1 and Roland's S-Series followed shortly afterwards.

During the 1980s, hybrid synthesizers began to utilize short samples (such as the attack phase of an instrument) along with digital synthesis to create more realistic imitations of instruments than had previously been possible. Examples are the Korg M1, Roland U-110, Yamaha's SY series, and the Kawai K series of instruments. Limiting factors at the time were the cost of physical memory (RAM) and the limitations of external data storage devices, and this approach made best use of the tiny amount of memory available to the design engineers.

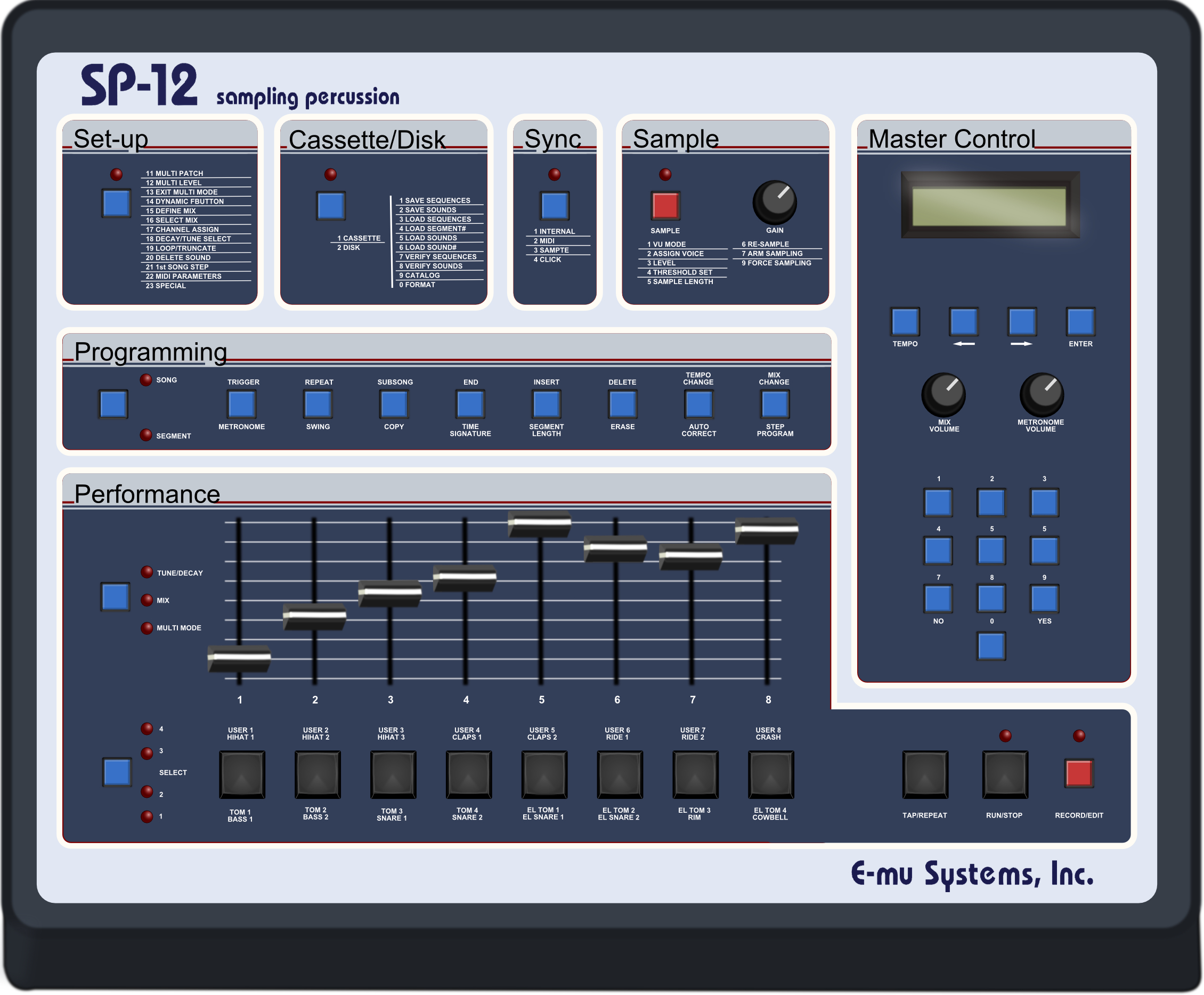
E-mu SP-12 (1986)

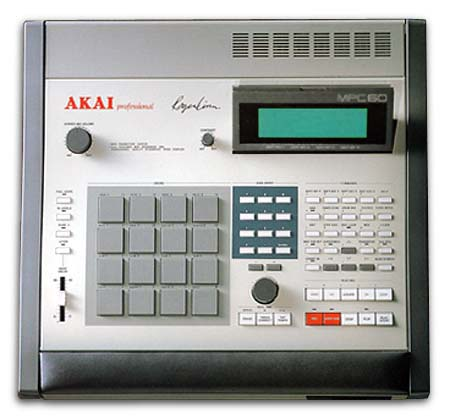
Akai MPC60 (1988)

The E-mu SP-1200 percussion sampler, upon its release in August 1987, popularized the use of digital samplers within hip-hop in the late 1980s. Akai pioneered many processing techniques, such as crossfade looping and "time stretch" to shorten or lengthen samples without affecting pitch and vice versa. The Akai MPC60, released in 1988, went on to become the most influential sampler in hip-hop music. That same year, the Ensoniq EPS – the successor to the Mirage – was launched and was the first sampling keyboard which was designed specifically for live performance rather being a purely studio based tool as most samplers had been hitherto.

In 1989, Keyboard Magazine published a comparison of samplers from Akai, Casio, E-MU, Ensoniq, Fairlight, Korg, Kurzweil, New England Digital, Oberheim, Roland, Sequential, Simmons, WaveFrame, and Yamaha. Prices ranged from $800 - $250,000.

The 2010s-era music workstation usually uses sampling, whether simple playback or complex editing that matches all but the most advanced dedicated samplers, and also includes features such as a sequencer. Samplers, together with traditional Foley artists, are the mainstay of modern sound effects production. Using digital techniques various effects can be pitch-shifted and otherwise altered in ways that would have required many hours when done with tape.

== Elements ==
=== Interface ===
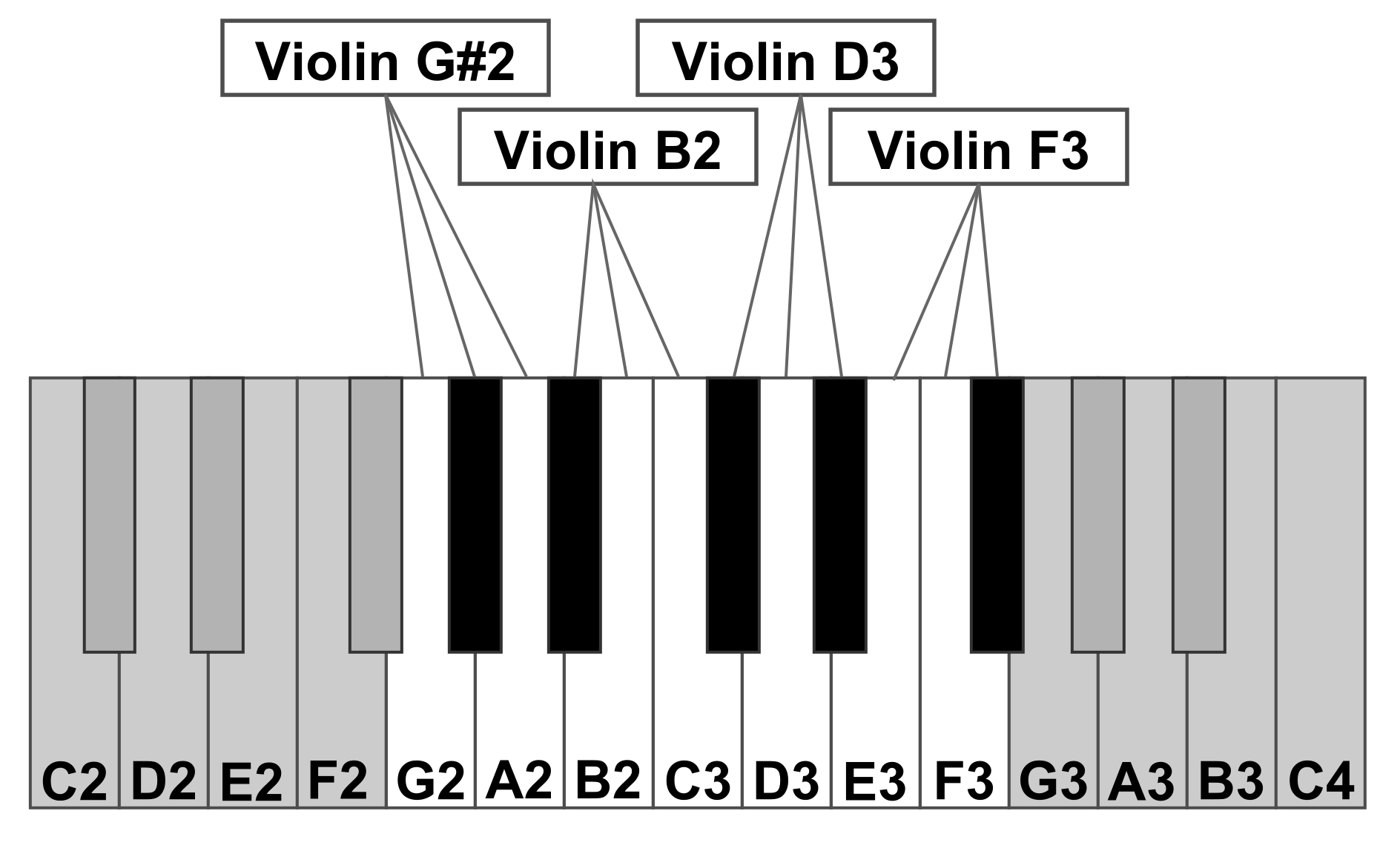
Fig. 1: An example of how multiple samples can be arranged across a keyboard range. In this example, four different recordings of a violin are distributed across 12 notes. Each sample will play back at three different pitch values

Usually a sampler is controlled by an attached music keyboard or other external MIDI controller or source. Each note-message received by the sampler accesses a particular sample. Often multiple samples are arranged across the keyboard, each assigned to a note or group of notes. Keyboard tracking allows samples to be shifted in pitch by an appropriate amount, typically in semitones and tones. Each group of notes to which a single sample has been assigned is often called a "keyzone", and the resultant set of zones is called a keymap.

For example, in Fig 1, a keymap has been created with four different samples. Each sample, if pitched, should be associated with a particular center pitch. The first sample (Violin G#2) is distributed across three different notes, G2, G#2, and A2. If the note G#2 is received the sampler will play back the Violin G#2 sample at its original pitch. If the note received is G2 the sampler will shift the sample down a semitone while the note A2 will play it back a semitone tone higher. If the next note (Bb2) is input the sampler will select the Violin B2 sample, playing it a semitone lower than its center pitch of B2.

In general, samplers can play back any kind of recorded audio. Most samplers have editing tools that allow the user to modify and process the audio and apply many effects. This can make a sampler a versatile musical tool.

=== Hierarchy ===
A sampler is organized into a hierarchy of progressively more complicated data structures. At the bottom lie samples, individual recordings of any sound, recorded at a particular sample rate and resolution. While a common sound to sample is a musical instrument being played (e.g., a pianist playing a piano note or an organist playing a pipe organ), a sample could be any sound, including "non-musical" sounds such as a typewriter clacking or a dog barking. A reference center pitch indicates the actual frequency of the recorded note. Samples may also be "looped" by defining points at which a repeated section of the sample starts and ends, allowing a relatively short sample to play endlessly. In some cases, a "loop crossfade" is indicated, allowing less obvious transitions at the loop point by fading the end of the loop out while fading its beginning in.

Keymaps are arranged into instruments. At this level parameters may be added to define how the keymaps are played. Filters can be applied to change the sound-color while low frequency oscillators and envelope generators can shape the amplitude, pitch, filter or other parameters of the sound. Instruments may have multiple layers of keymaps to play more than one sample at the same time and each keymap may have a different set of parameters so that the incoming note-events affect each layer differently. For example, two layers may have a different sensitivity to the velocity of the incoming note, altering the resulting timbre according to how hard the note is played.

At this level, there are two basic approaches to sampler organization. In a bank approach, each instrument is assigned to a different MIDI channel and multiple banks can be stored to reconfigure the sampler. A different and more powerful approach is to associate each instrument with a patch number or ID so that each MIDI channel can be configured separately by sending controller information on the individual channel.

=== Types ===
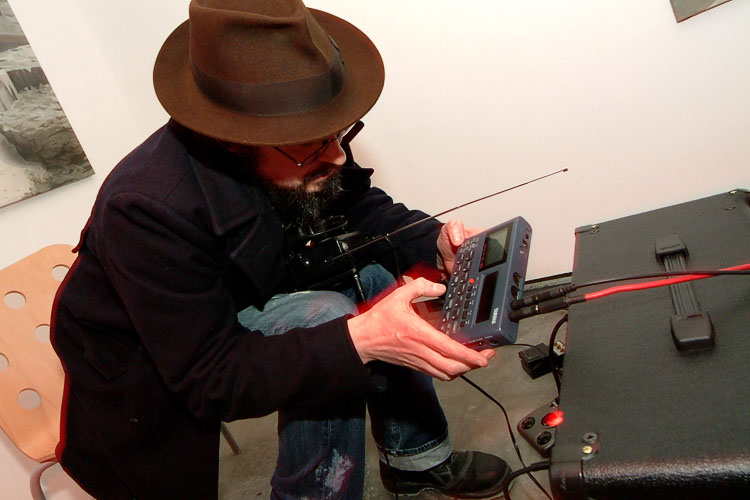
Joaquín Lana using a Yamaha SU10 sampler

Many samplers work as described above: the keymapping system "spread out" a sample over a certain range of keys. This has side-effects that may be desirable in some contexts, such as speeding up or slowing down drum loops. However, the higher and lower-pitched parts of such a keymap may sound unnatural. For example, if a harpsichord is sampled in its lower register and then the samples are moved up to very high pitches, the high notes may not sound natural and authentic. When arranging a pitched instrument over several keymaps, the transition from one to another may be too noticeable for realistic imitation of the instrument – the art is to make transitions as smooth as possible.

Some phrase samplers are more optimised for triggering single "one-shot" sounds such as drum hits. Each keymap spans only a single key, requiring a large number of zones (61 on a five-octave keyboard), each with its own settings. "Phrase sampling" aims to simplify this, particularly on interfaces such as the 16 pads on the Akai MPC series: the fact that each pad is actually a note is hidden from the user. The sampling engine does not re-pitch samples, it only plays them back. The user interface is simplified. Phrase samplers often have a groovebox format, which makes them lightweight, easy to operate and light to carry.

=== Specifications ===
Samplers can be classified by several specifications;

- Polyphony: How many voices (or notes) can play simultaneously, to create chords
- Sample Space: How much memory is available to load samples
- Channels: How many different MIDI channels are available for different instruments
- Bit depth: How much sample resolution can be supported
- Outputs: How many discrete audio outputs are available

== Memory requirements ==
As an example of memory required to sample an instrument (in this case a piano), assume:

Example piano library
Samples per layer	22 (1 per 4 keys)
Layers	3 (soft, hard, medium strike)
Sample rate	44.1 kHz
Channels	2 (stereo)
Average sample length	10 seconds
Coding	16 bit PCM, 2 bytes/sample, no compression

This requires (22 * 3 * 44100 * 2 * 2 * 10) bytes, or about 120 MB of memory. Reducing the sample length by using loops, reduced sample rate or compression to 2 seconds could trim this memory footprint to 24 MB. Memory usage can be reduced by sample rate reduction or by looping. A set of modern piano samples use 500 MB - 18 GB. In a 1989 review of 31 samplers, only 4 could expand to more than 10 MB:

1989 >10MB samplers
Manufacturer/model	Max Memory
E-MU Emulator 3	16 MB (claimed 8 MB in another review)
Fairlight CMI 3	28 MB
NED Synclavier	96 MB
WaveFrame AudioFrame	120MB

Comparing 32 MB (1989) sample set to a 32 GB (2025), the cost of only the memory (by decades):

RAM cost, 2020 $
Year	32 MB	32 GB
1989	$7,500	$7,500,000
1999	$39	$39,000
2009	$.38	$380
2019	$.09	$90

== Manufacturers and models ==
=== Computer Music Melodian ===
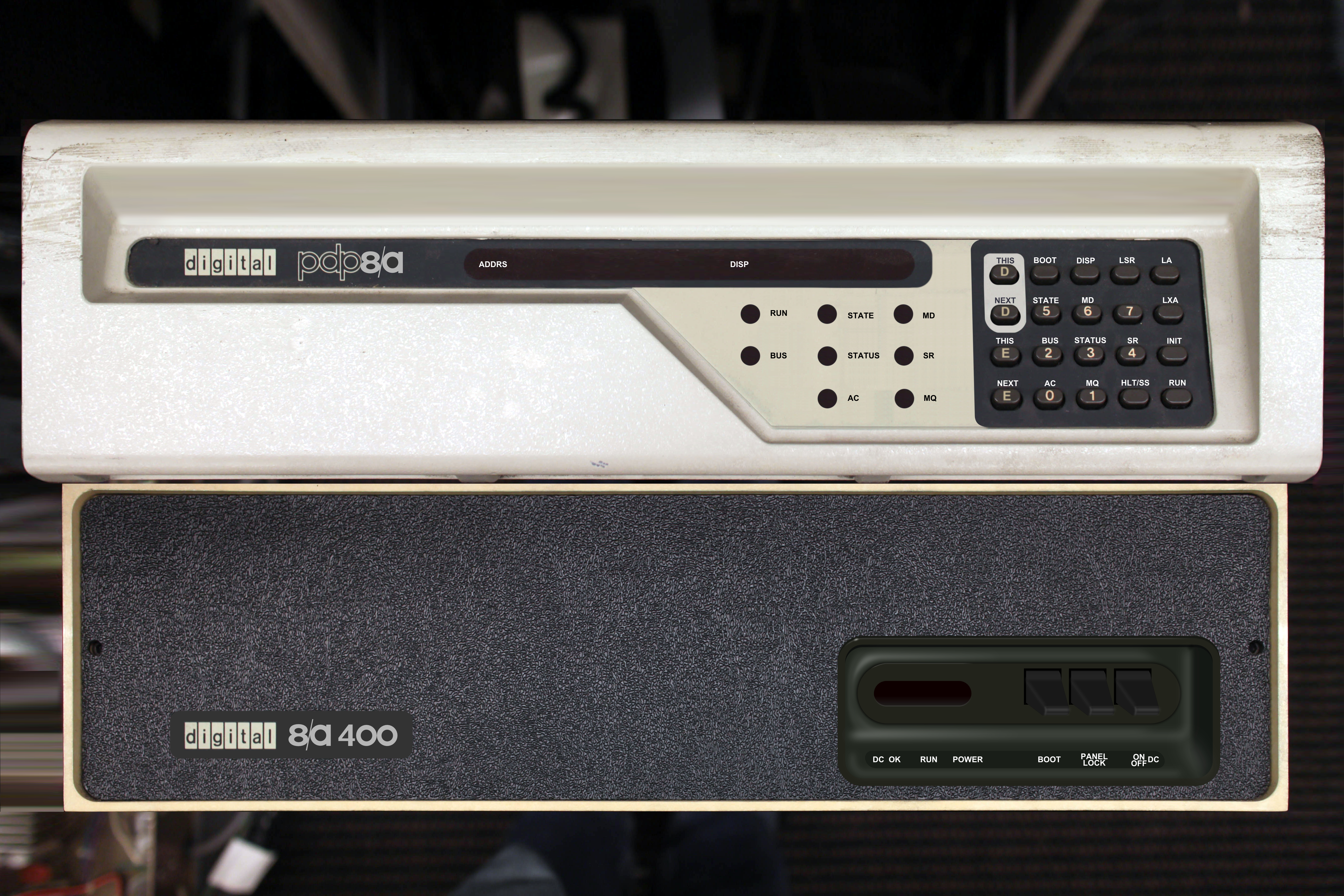
DEC PDP-8/A (a minicomputer). Computer Music Melodian (1976) was developed based on it

Computer Music Inc. was started in New Jersey United States in 1972 by Harry Mendell and Dan Coren. The company was established to develop and market musical instruments based on computer software. The Melodian, developed in 1976, was based on Digital Equipment Corporation's PDP-8 computer. It included hand-wired digital-to-analog and analog-to-digital conversion functions, as well as tracking anti-aliasing filters. The Melodian was first used by Stevie Wonder on his album Stevie Wonder's Journey Through "The Secret Life of Plants" (1979).

The Melodian was a monophonic synthesizer with 12-bit analog-to-digital sampling at rates up to 22 kHz. It was designed to be compatible with analog synthesizers and had a feature allowing it to synchronize to the pitch of an analog synthesizer, such as an ARP 2600. This meant that the Melodian captured all frequency modulation effects, including those produced through the ARP's touch ribbon control. It also could trigger off the ARPs keyboard, thus functioning somewhat as a hybrid of sampler and analog synthesizer and making the most of the technology available at the time.

=== Synclavier ===
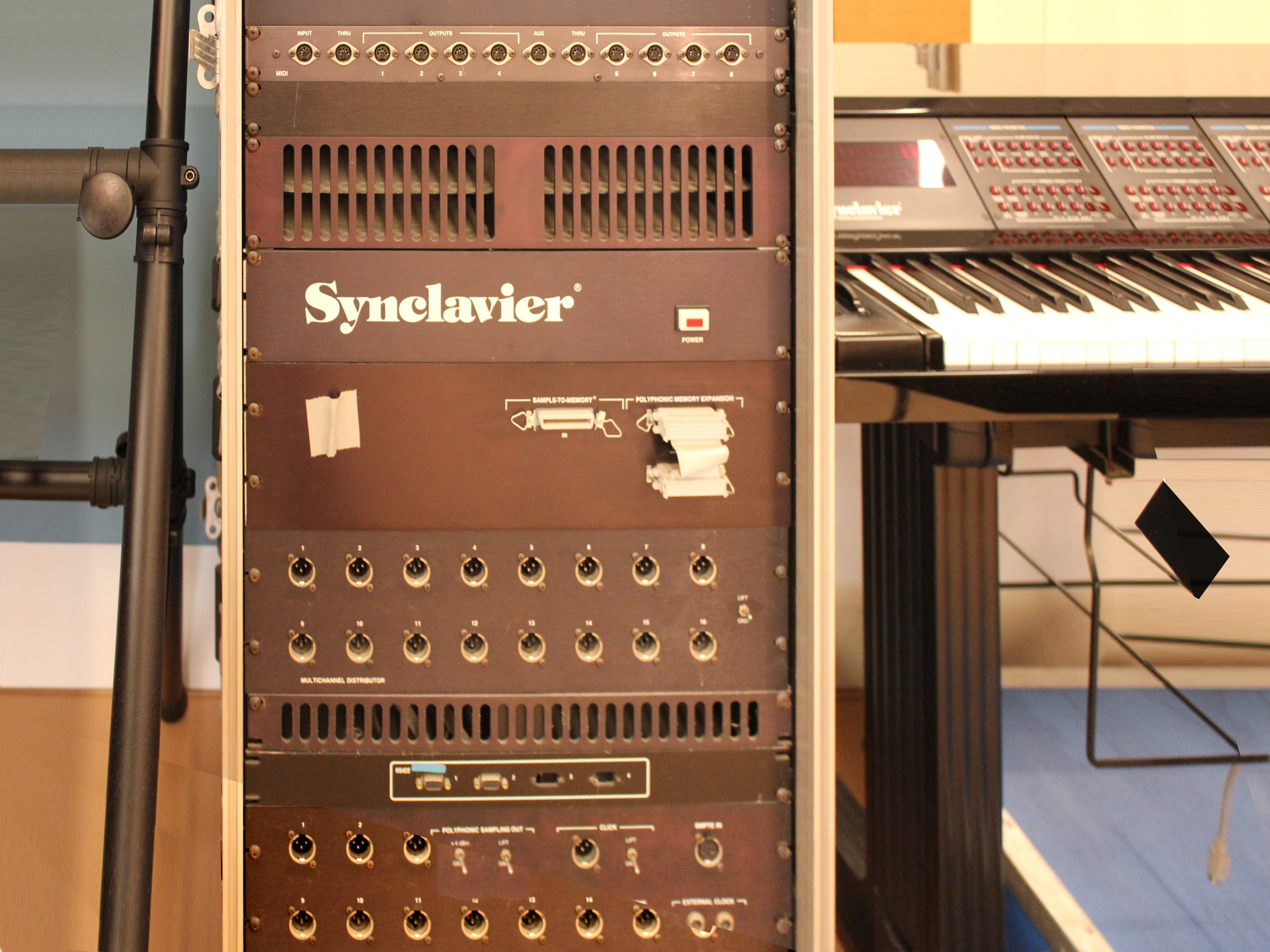
Synclavier PSMT rack (1984)

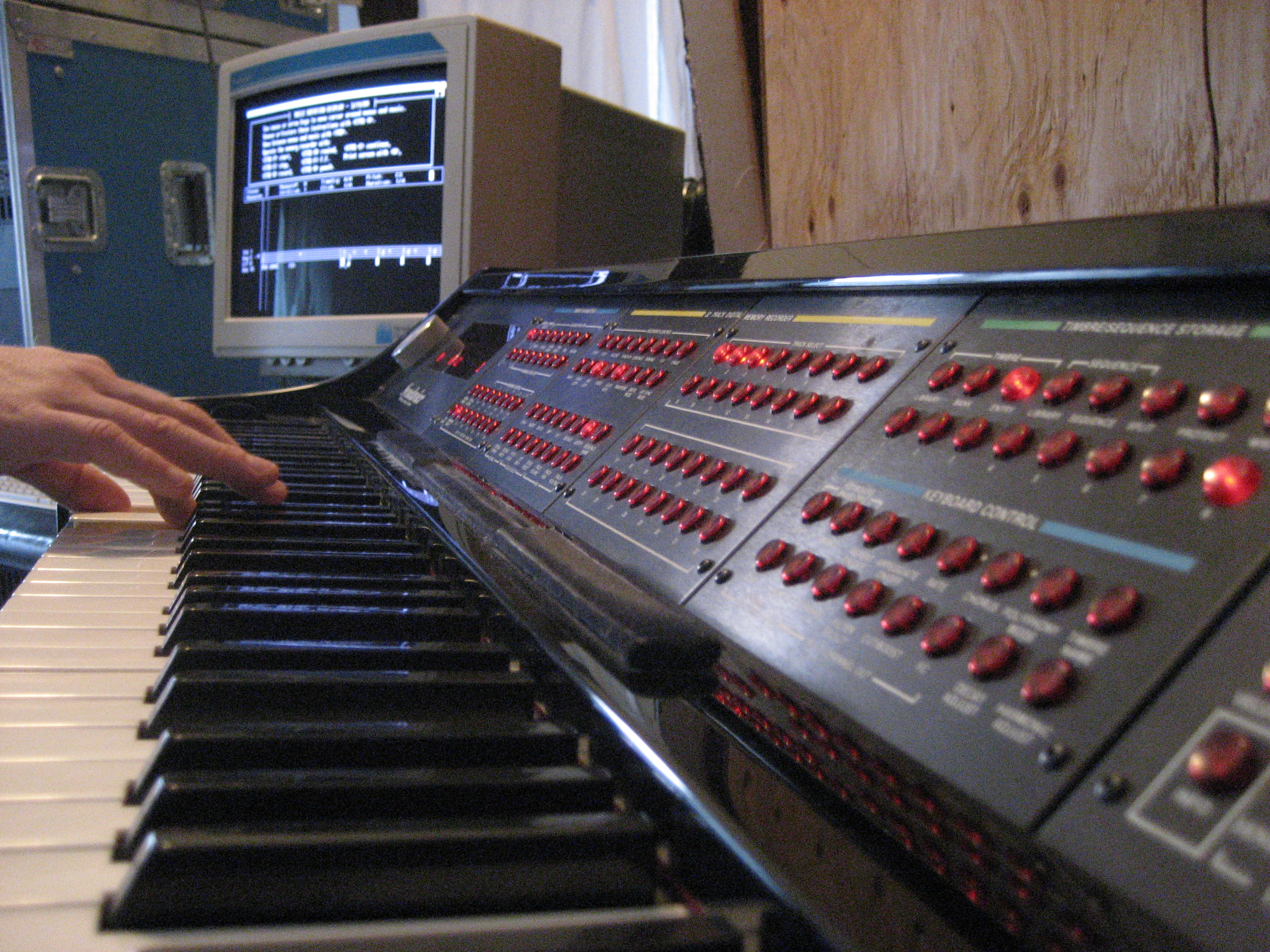
Synclavier PSMT & VPK (1984)

The Synclavier System was an early digital synthesizer and sampler, manufactured by New England Digital. First released in 1977, it proved to be highly influential among both music producers and electronic musicians, due to its versatility, its cutting-edge technology and distinctive sound. Synclavier Systems were expensive – the highest price ever paid for one was about $500,000, although average systems were closer to about $200,000 – $300,000. Although this made it inaccessible for most musicians, it found widespread use among producers and professional recording studios, and it competed in this market with other high-end production systems, such as the Fairlight CMI. Though scarce, the Synclavier remains in use in many studios to this day.

=== Fairlight Instruments ===
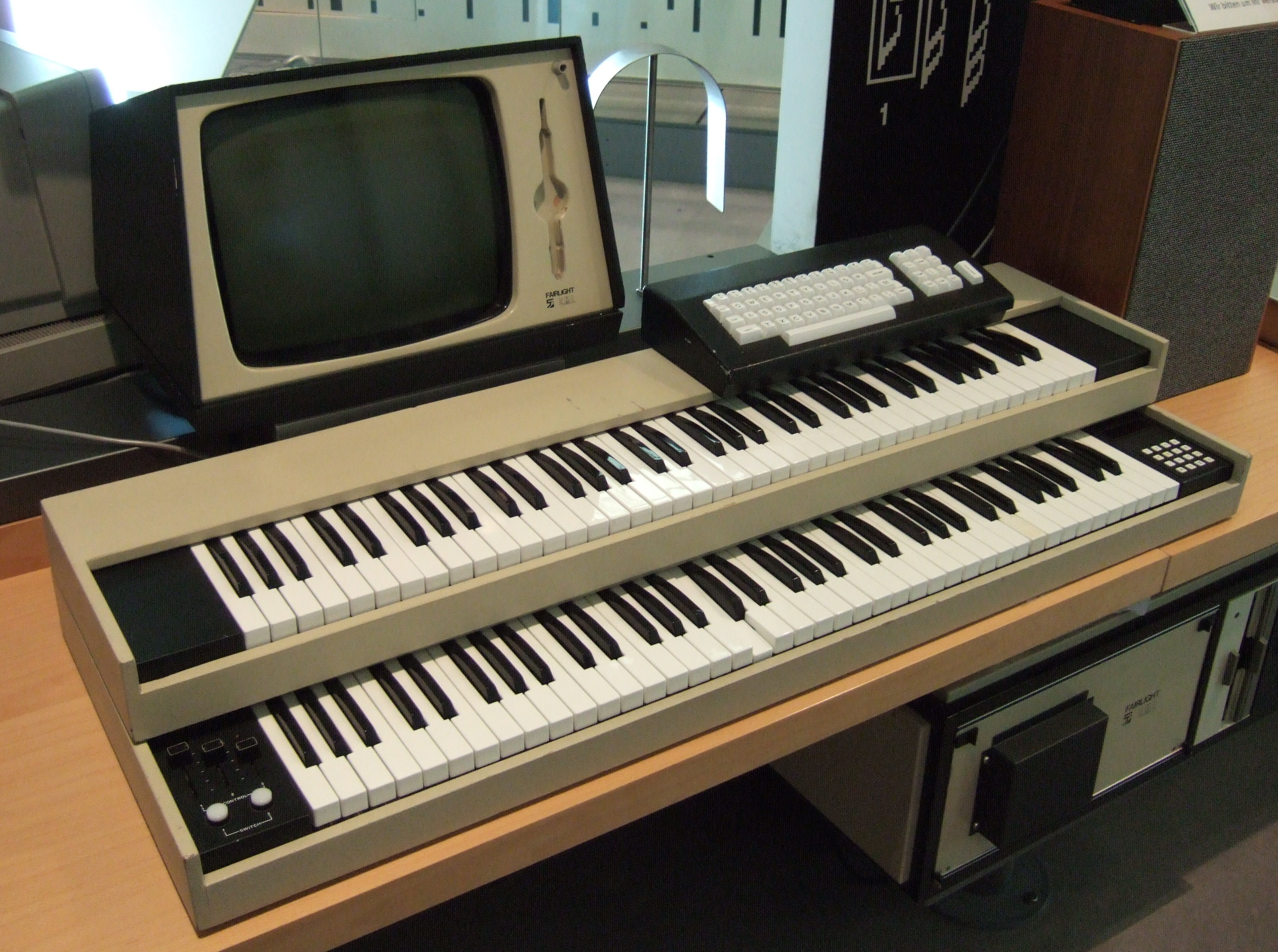
Fairlight CMI (1979)

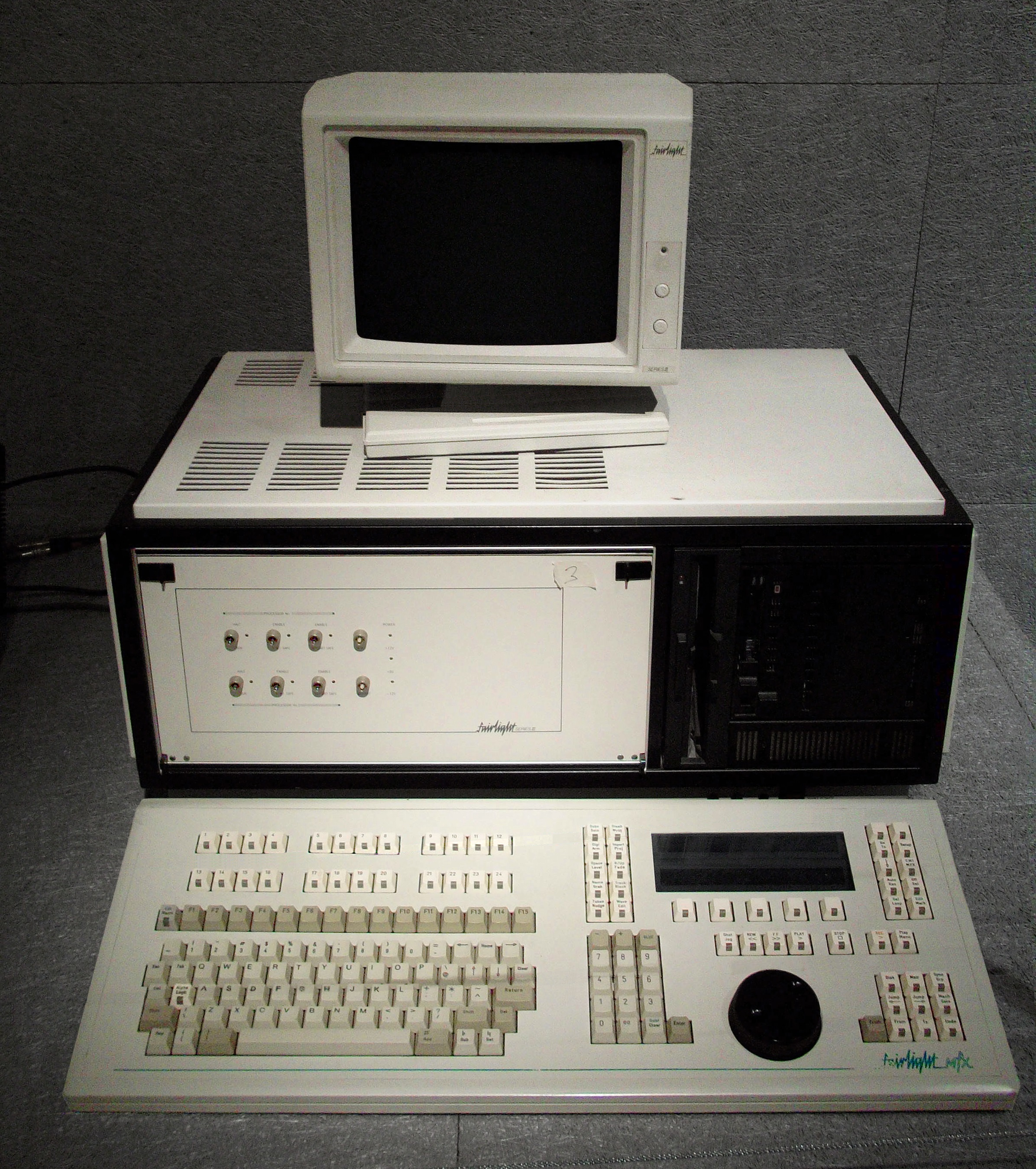
Fairlight CMI Series III (1985)

Fairlight Instruments was started in Sydney, in 1975 by Peter Vogel and Kim Ryrie. The company was originally established as a manufacturer and retailer of video special effects equipment.

The Fairlight CMI or Computer Music Instrument, released in 1979, started life as the Qasar M8. The M8 was handwired and legend has it that it took two hours to boot up. The CMI was the first commercially available polyphonic digital sampling instrument. The original Fairlight CMI sampled using a resolution of 8 bits per sample, at a rate of 24 kHz, and used two 8-bit Motorola 6800 processors (later upgraded to the more powerful 16/32-bit Motorola 68000). It was equipped with two six-octave keyboards, an alphanumeric keyboard, and an interactive video display unit (VDU) where soundwaves could be edited or even drawn from scratch using a light pen. Software allowed for editing, looping, and mixing of sounds which could then be played back via the keyboard or the software-based sequencer. It retailed for around US$25,000.

Fairlight later released the Series IIx, which increased the sampling rate to 32 kHz and was the first to feature basic MIDI functionality. In 1985, the Series III was released with two significant upgrades: bit rate and sampling rate were increased to CD quality (16 bit/44.1 kHz) and SMPTE time code was now supported. Notable users of the Fairlight CMI include Peter Gabriel, Herbie Hancock, Trevor Horn, Art of Noise, Yello, Pet Shop Boys, Jean Michel Jarre, Duran Duran and Kate Bush. Horn, considered the "Man who invented the eighties", first used his well-known sampling techniques on the album Adventures in Modern Recording, the second studio album released under the name of his project The Buggles. Saying that he was "quite fascinated by Fairlight brass and all of those kind of things that Geoffrey and I had started messing around with before he went off to join Asia", the sampling techniques on Adventures would later be used for records Horn produced like Slave to the Rhythm by Grace Jones, Art of Noise's The Seduction of Claude Debussy and Frankie Goes To Hollywood's Welcome to the Pleasuredome.

=== WaveFrame AudioFrame ===
WaveFrame was an American digital audio technology company founded in 1986 in Boulder, Colorado. Its flagship product, the AudioFrame, was an integrated digital audio workstation system, introducing fixed-rate digital sampling synthesis, multi-phase interpolation, hard-disk recording, automation, and SMPTE-time code based non-linear editing. Memory expansion was up to 120 MB. A detailed, 4-part review and analysis of the products was written by Chris Meyer

The pitch shifting was accomplished with digital, poly-phase interpolations, allowing further processing without analog to digital re-conversion.

"The Sampling Synthesizer cards create 512 points for every existing sample. The bonus that falls out of this is that these 511 extra points are also used to pick zero crossings from for looping. Therefore, there's a better chance of picking a point where the original signal would have actually crossed zero, and single-cycle waves are better in tune (no need to settle for points just short or just long of where the signal would have crossed)."

=== E-mu Systems ===
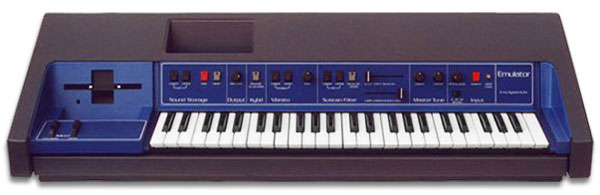
Emulator I (1981)

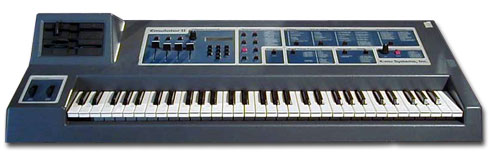
Emulator II (1984)

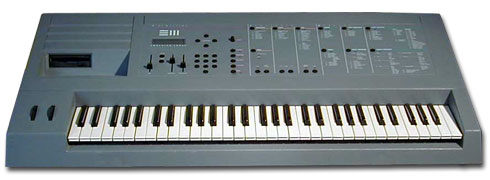
Emulator III (1987)

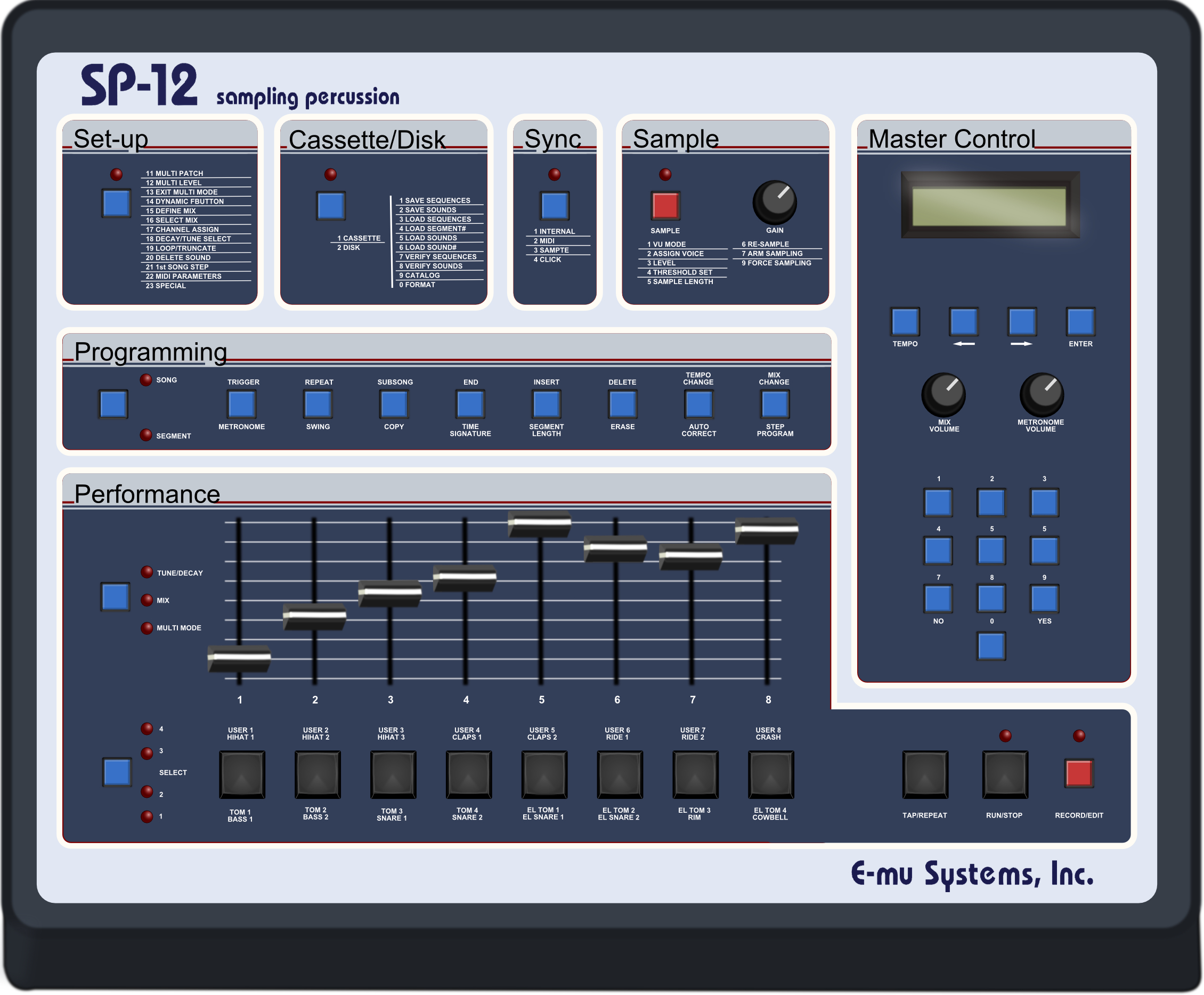
E-mu SP-12 (1986)

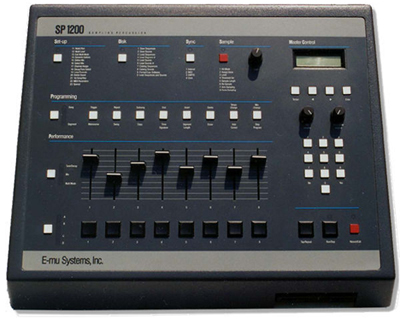
E-mu SP-1200 (1987)

E-mu Emulator (1981) was E-mu Systems' initial foray into sampling, and saved the company from financial disaster after the complete failure of the Audity due to a price tag of $70,000. The name 'Emulator' came as the result of leafing through a thesaurus and matched the name of the company perfectly. The Emulator came in 2-, 4-, and 8-note polyphonic versions, the 2-note being dropped due to limited interest, and featured a maximum sampling rate of 27.7 kHz, a four-octave keyboard and 128 kB of memory.

E-mu Emulator II (1984) was designed to bridge the gap between the Fairlight CMI and Synclavier and the Ensoniq Mirage. It featured 8 notes polyphony, 8-bit sampling, 512kb of RAM (1mb in the EII+ though only accessible as two independent 512kb banks), an 8-track sequencer, and analog filtering. With the addition of the hard disk option, the Emulator II was comparable to samplers released 5 years later.

E-mu SP-12 (1986) was a forerunner of E-mu SP-1200.

E-mu Emulator III (1987) was a 16-bit stereo digital sampler with 16-note polyphony, 44.1 kHz maximum sample rate and had up to 8 MB of memory. It featured a 16 channel sequencer, SMPTE and a 40 MB hard disk.

E-mu SP-1200 (1987) was, and still is, one of the most highly regarded samplers for use in hip-hop related production. Its 12-bit sampling engine gave a desirable warmth to instruments and a gritty punch to drums. It featured 10 seconds of sample time spread across four 2.5-second sections.

E-mu Emax, sold between 1985 & 1995, and aimed at the lower end of the market.

E-mu ESI-32 (1994) was a stripped down, far cheaper, and simplified EIIIx, and could use the same samples. The unit could accommodate up to 32 MB RAM, 32-note polyphony and sounds could be routed internally to one of four polyphonic outputs. Via optional SCSI interface, the ESI-32 could access external CD-ROM, Zip-100, and hard drives.

=== Akai ===
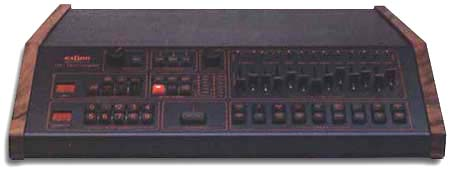
Linn LM-1 (1980)

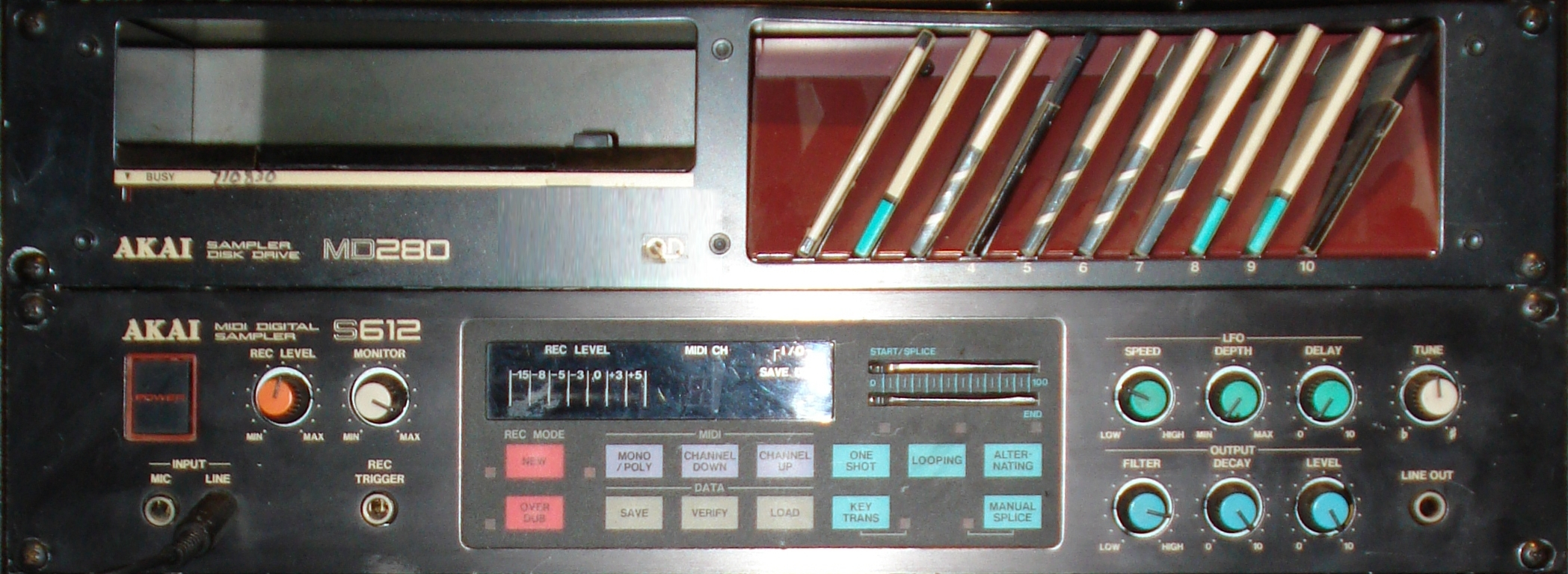
Akai S612 (1985)

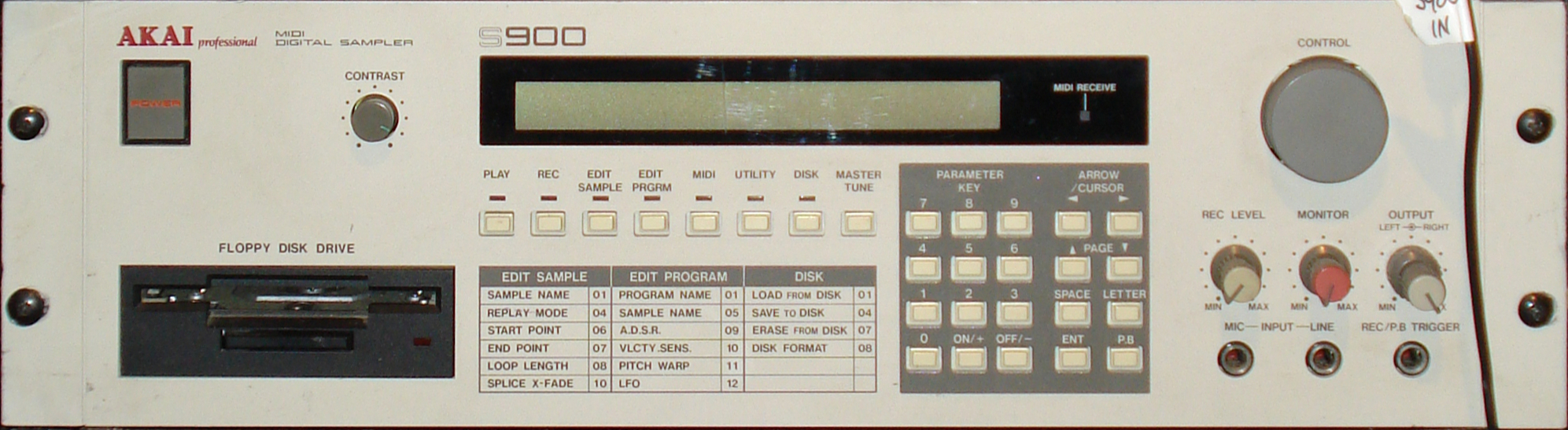
Akai S900 (1986)

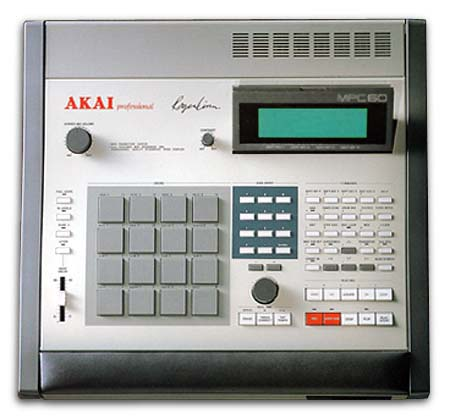
Akai MPC60 (1988)

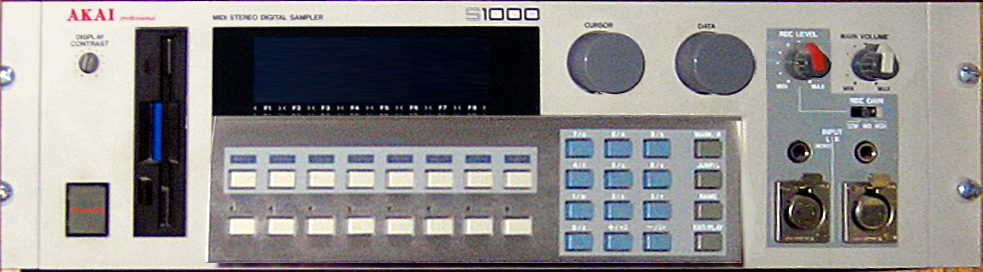
Akai S1000 (1988)

Akai entered the electronic musical instrument world in 1984 when Roger Linn, the creator of the Linn LM-1, the Linn 9000, and the LinnDrum, partnered with the Japanese/Singaporean Akai Corporation to create samplers similar to the ones created at Linn's own company, Linn Electronics. With this came the first in a series of affordable samplers, the S612, a 12 bit digital sampler module. The S612 was superseded in 1986 by the S900.

The Akai S900 (1986) was the first truly affordable digital sampler. It was 8-note polyphonic and featured 12-bit sampling with a frequency range up to 40 kHz and up to 750 kB of memory that allowed for just under 12 seconds at the best sampling rate. It could store a maximum of 32 samples in memory. The operating system was software based and allowed for upgrades that had to be booted each time the sampler was switched on.

The Akai MPC60 Digital Sampler/Drum Machine and MIDI Sequencer (1988) was the first non-rack mounted model released. It is also the first time a sampler with touch sensitive trigger pads was produced by AKAI, giving birth to the popular MPC series of sampler sequencers.

The Akai S950 (1988) was an improved version of the S900, with a maximum sample frequency of 48 kHz and some of the editing features of the contemporary S1000.

The Akai S1000 (1988) was possibly the most popular 16-bit 44.1 kHz stereo sampler of its time. It featured 16-voices, up to 32 MB of memory, and 24-bit internal processing, including a digital filter (18 dB/octave), an LFO, and two ADSR envelope generators (for amplitude and filtering). The S1000 also offered up to 8 different loop points. Additional functions included Autolooping, Crossfade Looping, Loop in Release (which cycles through the loop as the sound decays), Loop Until Release (which cycles through the loop until the note begins its decay), Reverse and Time Stretch (version 1.3 and higher).

Other samplers released by AKAI include the S01, S20, S700, S2000, S2800, S3000, S3000XL, S3200, S5000, S6000, MPC500, MPC1000, MPC2000, MPC2000XL, MPC2500, MPC3000, MPC3000XL, MPC3000LE, MPC4000, MPC5000, Z4 and Z8.

=== Roland ===
Roland Corporation manufactured the S series. These were true samplers that provide all of the features described above, including sampling, sample editing, pitch transposition, and keyzone mapping:

- Roland S-10
- Roland S-50
- Roland S-330
- Roland S-550
- Roland S-760
- Roland S-770

More recently, Roland introduced the Groove Sampler concept. These devices are renowned for their ease of use, but a few lack the pitch transposition and keyzone mapping capabilities that most samplers have. Some have limits to rendering loops or sound effects samples that are played back at the same pitch they were recorded. Although these machines are equipped with a wide range of built-in effects, a few lack pitch transposition and keyzone mapping that diminishes their utility significantly. The Roland Groove Sampler line includes the following:

- Roland DJ-70MKII
- Roland DJ-70
- Roland JS-30
- Roland MC-909
- Roland MC-808
- Roland MC-09
- Roland MS-1
- Roland MV-8800
- Roland MV-8000
- Roland SP-808EX
- Roland SP-808
- Roland SP-404
- Roland SP-606
- Roland SP-555
- Roland W-30
- Roland SPD-SX

=== Boss ===
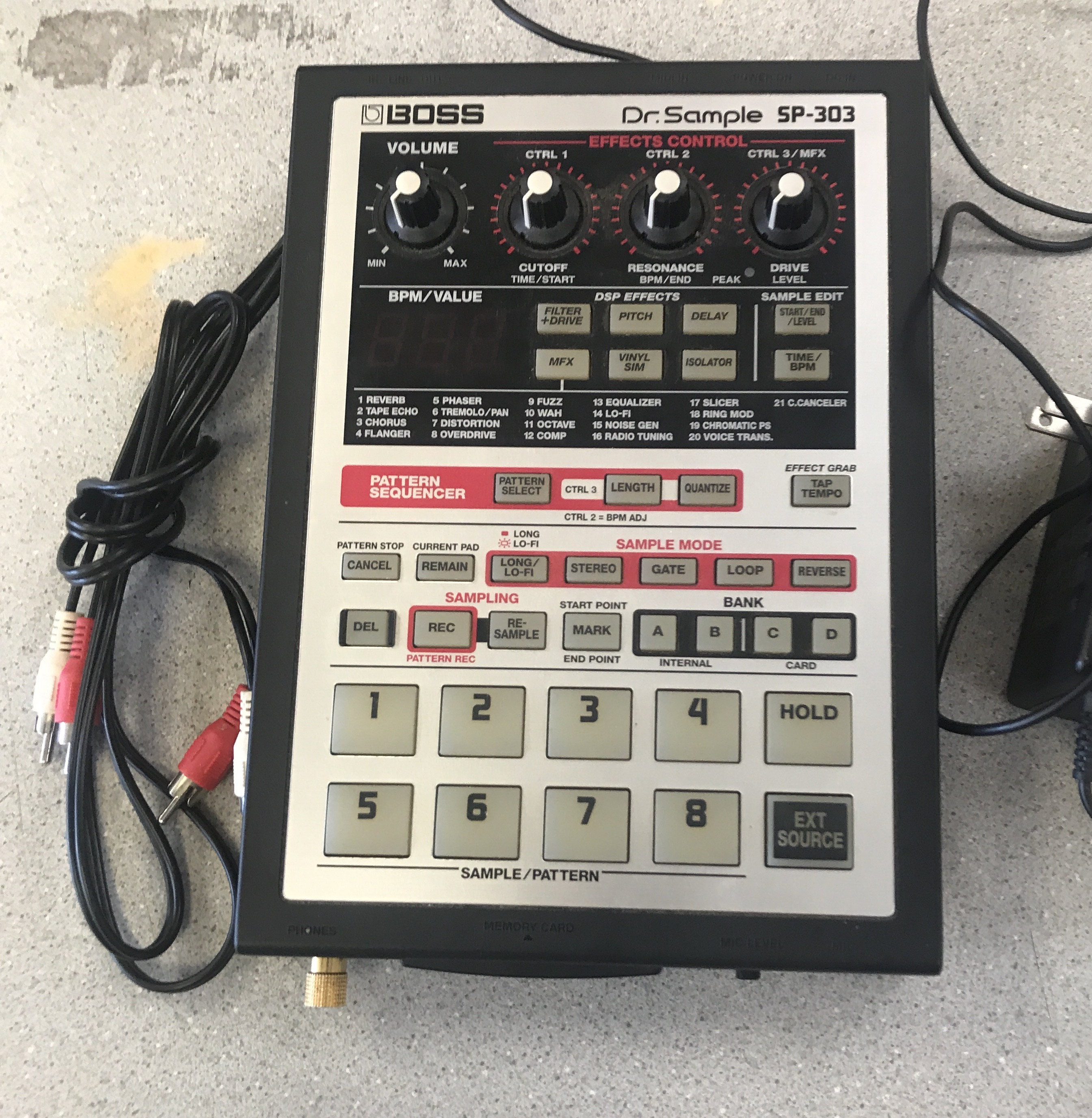
Boss Dr. Sample SP-303 (2001)

Being a division of the Roland Corporation, Boss also contributed to the Groove Sampler/Groove Box concept with several samplers.

- Boss SP-202
- Boss SP-303
- Boss SP-505

=== Sample storage ===
Most older samplers use SCSI as the protocol for getting sample data in and out of the machine. SCSI interfaces were either standard on the sampler or offered as an option. SCSI provides the ability to move large quantities of data in and out of a sampler in reasonable times. Hard drives, CD-ROM drives, Zip drives and removable cartridge drives such as Syquest and Iomega Jaz drives are the most popular SCSI devices used with samplers. Each has its own strengths and weaknesses, with hard drives being the fastest devices. Modern (after 2000) samplers use solid-state memory cards (such as compact Flash or SmartMedia) for sample storage and transfer.

== Software samplers ==
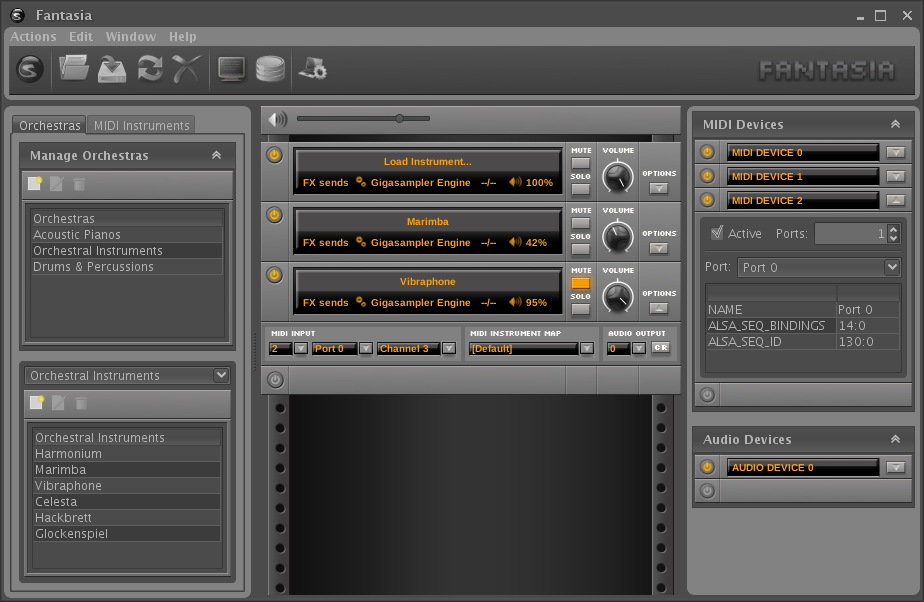
Fantasia, a user interface for LinuxSampler. LinuxSampler is a clone of GigaSampler by NemeSys, which was one of the first disk-streaming software samplers on PC.

In the 1990s and 2000s, the increases in computer power and memory capacity have made it possible to develop software applications that provide the same capabilities as hardware-based units. These are typically produced as virtual instrument plug-ins – for example, using the VST system. Some such samplers provide relatively simple sample playback facilities, requiring the user to turn to other software for such tasks as sample editing, sample recording, and DSP effects, while others provide features beyond those offered by rack-mounted units.

=== Trackers ===
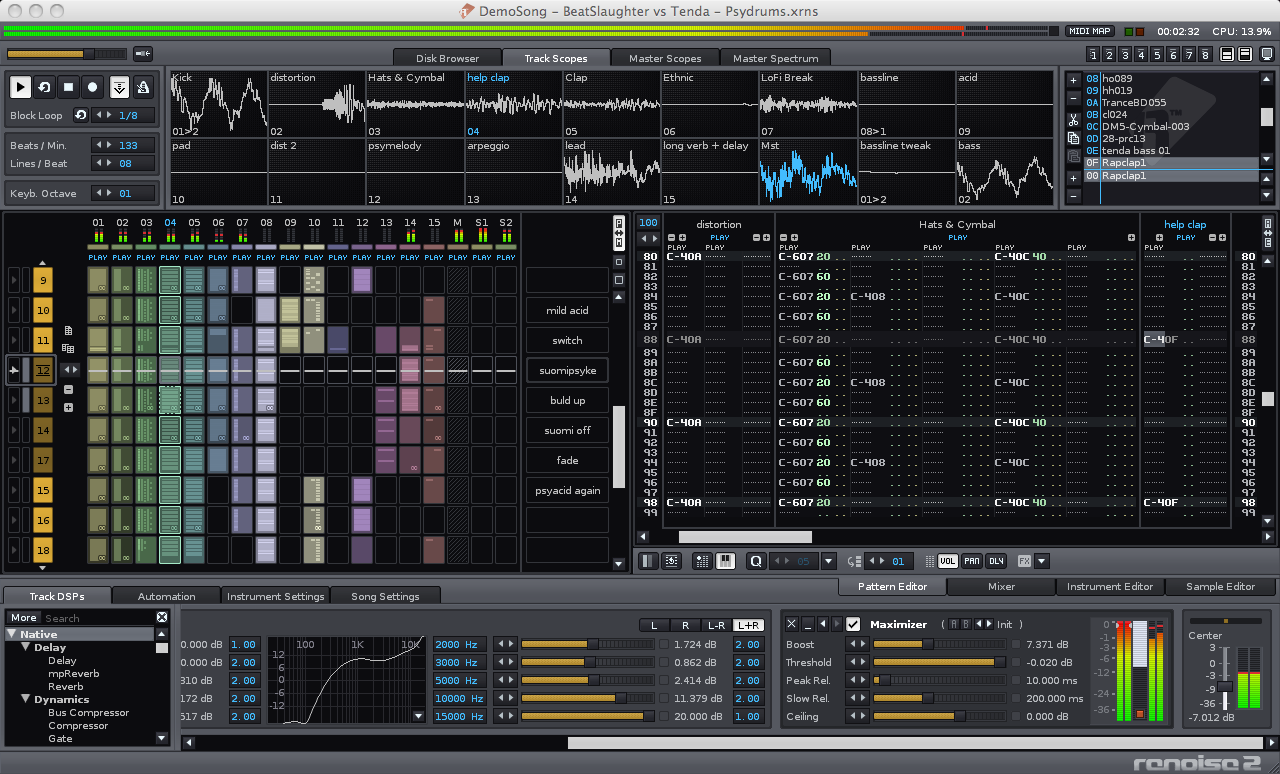
Renoise, a graphical Tracker sequencer with integrated sampler

In the 1980s, users on Home computers invented Trackers. Sequencers are software samplers as the real-time resampling is a required capability for the Tracker concept. Since the 1980s, Trackers were able to perform 4-channel resampling in realtime under usage of the Paula Chip on the Amiga. Since the early 1990s Trackers performed on PCs multi-track resampling in realtime as pure software solution. This was possible under the usage of highly optimized assembly code, an early example is the Inertia Player released on 24 December 1993. A recent PC Tracker with good sampler capabilities is for instance the Renoise Tracker.

== See also ==
Concepts

- Sampling (music)
- Remix
- Rompler
- Digital audio workstation

Synthesizers

- Sample-based synthesis
- Drum machine

Historical

- Optophonic Piano
- Lichttonorgel (in German)
- Chamberlin
- Mellotron
