= Roland SP-606 =

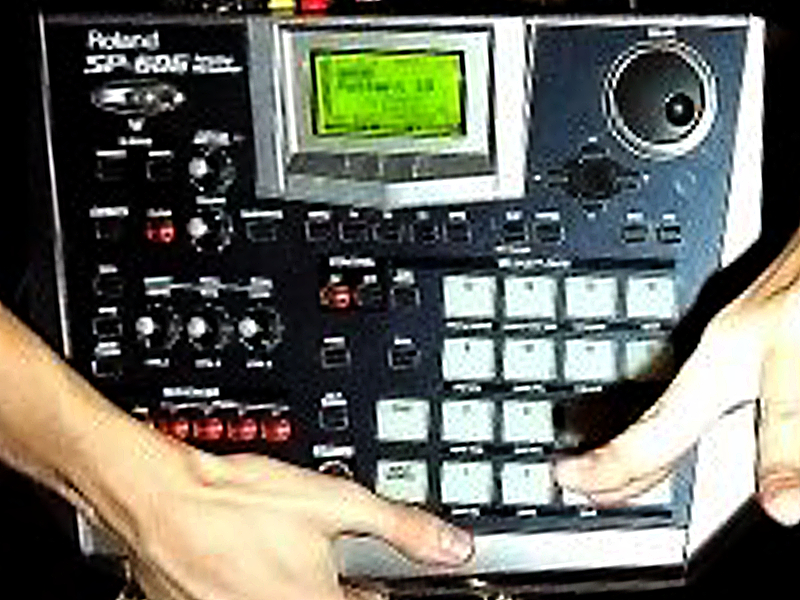
The Roland SP-606

The Roland SP-606 is a music sampler manufactured by Roland Corporation. It is part of the SP family, which includes Roland’s popular SP-303 and SP-404 installments. Released in the year of 2004, the sampler was soon succeeded in 2005 by the SP-404.

== Features ==
SP Lineage

The following list is a correct order of each SP installment's release, as an attempt to help musicians avoid any confusion.

- Boss SP-202 (1998)
- Roland SP-808 GrooveSampler (1998)
- Roland SP-808EX/E-Mix Studio (2000)
- Boss SP-303 (2001)
- Boss SP-505 (2002)
- Roland SP-606 (2004)
- Roland SP-404 (2005)
- Roland SP-555 (2008)
- Roland SP-404SX (2009)
- Roland SP-404A (2017)
- Roland SP-404MKII (2021)

Unlike the predecessors, the SP-606 was designed in collaboration with Cakewalk. As a result, the sampler was bundled with the then-new P606 software from Cakewalk for enhanced integration and functionality with a PC. The SP-606 has over 40 various effects, which include Isolator, Filter + Drive, Slicer, Reverb, Tape Echo. It also has the D Beam feature, which allows the user to control 3 different effects physically, including synth, trigger, and filter. The maximum number of samples that can be internally stored is 128. Samples are recorded in 'SP606 original format', with the memory used equating roughly to 16MB. Audio samples are imported and exported in WAV/AIF file format, by way of CompactFlash. Additionally, CompactFlash is used to update the sampler itself. MIDI can be transferred via USB connection for both Mac and PC.

== Users ==
Despite not being initially popular and successful as the SP-303 and SP-404 installments upon release, the digital sampler managed to receive a small following over the years, being utilized by notable producers such as Madlib and Conductor Williams.
