= Roland SP-555 =

Discontinued music sampler

The Roland SP-555 is a discontinued music sampler manufactured by Roland Corporation. The 555 is part of the SP family, which includes Boss’s popular SP-303 and Roland's SP-404 installments. The sampler was released in 2008.

== Features ==
SP Lineage

The following list is a correct order of each SP installment's release, as an attempt to help musicians avoid any confusion.

- Boss SP-202 (1998)
- Roland SP-808 GrooveSampler (1998)
- Roland SP-808EX E-Mix Studio (2000)
- Boss SP-303 (2001)
- Boss SP-505 (2002)
- Roland SP-606 (2004)
- Roland SP-404 (2005)
- Roland SP-555 (2008)
- Roland SP-404SX (2009)
- Roland SP-404A (2017)
- Roland SP-404MKII (2021)

The SP-555 has a microphone input that accepts 1/4 inch phone type, XLR type, and Hi-Z. The SP-555 also incorporates a loop capture setting, which allows looping samples that one can add to until recording is stopped. A total of 37 built-in effects can be assigned to 16 pressure-sensitive pads. In similarity to the SP-808 installment, the sampler has the D Beam feature, which allows one to control 3 different effects physically, including synth, trigger, and filter. "V-Link" connects the sampler to lighting, allowing light effects to change in sync with the sample or loop. The SP-555 also has several pre-loaded live FX, including Voice Transformer, Delay, Isolator, "Super Filter", and "DJFX Looper". One feature, the Effect Memory, recalls previous settings on the pads without interrupting any sound while switching effects.

== Users ==
- Animal Collective members, Panda Bear & Geologist
- Kai Campos, member of English electronic music duo Mount Kimbie
- Mndsgn can be seen performing live with the SP-555 in his March 2014 Boiler Room set.
- Moka Only, Canadian rapper, singer and record producer
- Palaceer Lazaro of Shabazz Palaces uses an SP-555 for the group's NPR Tiny Desk Concert.
- Oneohtrix Point Never used one for the production of his 2011 album Replica, and has since been sold.
