= Roland DJ-70 =

Digital music sampler and keyboard

Roland DJ-70 (Italy) / Roland DJ-70MKII (Italy)
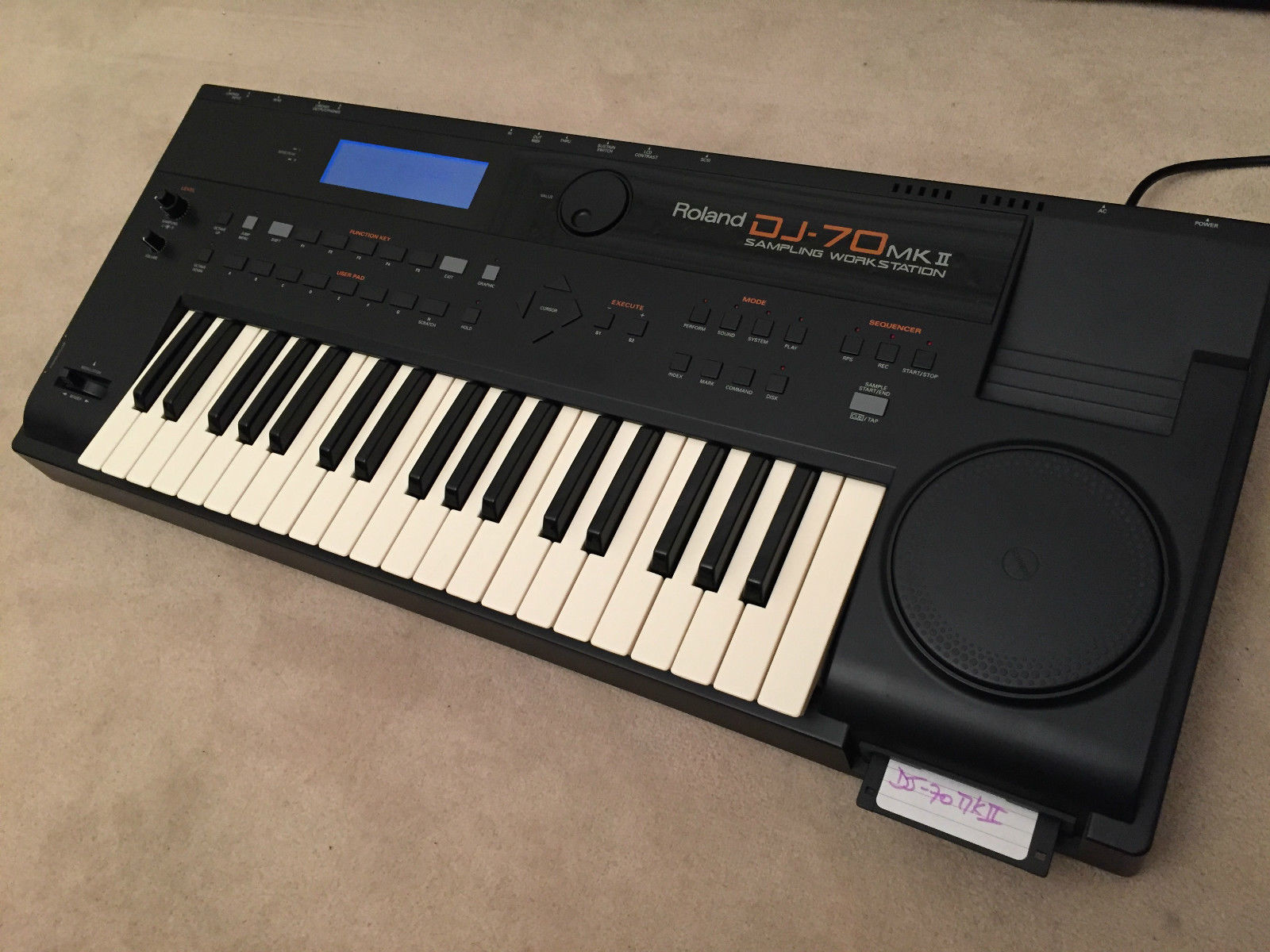
- Roland DJ-70MKII
- Manufacturer: Roland (Italy)
- Dates: 1992-1996 DJ-70; 1996-2000 DJ-70MKII
- Price: £2,181 GBP (1998) $1,995 US (1998)

Technical specifications
- Polyphony: 24 Voices Note
- LFO: Sine, Triangle, Saw-Up/Down, Square, Random, Peak-Hold Waveforms with Delay, Polarity and Sync
- Synthesis type: ROM / EPROM Chip; OS: V1.05 (1992); Roland DJ-70; OS: V1.02 (1996); Roland DJ-70MKII
- Filter: Low Pass, High Pass, Band Pass, TVA = (Time Variant Amplifier); TVF = (Time Variant Filter)
- Aftertouch expression: Yes
- Velocity expression: Yes
- Storage memory: (30-pin for MKI) 72-pin SIMMs Memory Type; 2MB up to 4MB (DJ-70); 2MB up to 32MB (DJ-70MKII)

Input/output
- Keyboard: 37 Dynamic Keys, 8 Play Pads, Pitchbender Joystick and a Special Scratch Dial/Scratch Pad.

The Roland DJ-70 is a 16-bit linear A/D Conversion & 20-bit linear D/A Conversion sampling workstation and was released in 1992 by Roland Italy.

== Roland DJ-70MKII ==
The Roland DJ-70MKII was released in 1996 by Roland Italy. It had 37 keys, 8 Play Pads (Pitchbender Joystick and featured the first ever for DJ's a Special Scratch Dial/Scratch Pad), 24 Voice Note Polyphony, 8 Track music sequencer, with RPS/BPM Function and featured a 3.5"in. floppy disk drive (2DD/2HD), "Load-While-Play" feature, SCSI port only on Roland DJ-70MKII. It also had a large backlit LCD screen. The Roland DJ-70MKII with its more powerful features then the Roland DJ-70, was essentially a Roland S-760 rack mount sampler with a keyboard.

== Sample Rate ==
Up to 32 samples can be recorded. The Sampling Frequency Rates can be used are 16-bit 22.05 kHz or 44.1 kHz. Roland DJ-70 & Roland DJ-70MKII both can read on 3.5" floppy disk drive (2DD/2HD) file from Roland S-50 Sampling Keyboard, Roland W-30 Sampling Keyboard, Roland S330/S550/SP-700/S770/S750/S760 rack mount sampler (Using CONVERT LOAD feature). AKAI S1000/1100 sounds via 'SCSI port (Roland DJ-70MKII only)'.

Roland DJ-70:

• Memory 2MB [Sample Time: 22.5 sec.(44.1 kHz) Stereo. 45 sec.(22.05 kHz) Mono.]

• Memory 4MB [Sample Time: 45.3 sec.(44.1 kHz) Stereo. 90 sec.(22.05 kHz) Mono.]

Roland DJ-70MKII:

• Memory 2MB [Sample Time: 22.5 sec.(44.1 kHz) Stereo. 45 sec.(22.05 kHz) Mono.]

• Memory 32MB [Sample Time: 6 min.(44.1 kHz) Stereo. 12 min.(22.05 kHz) Mono.]

Both Roland DJ-70 & Roland DJ-70MKII use RAM Memory type, there are two slot available. Type used are (30-pin for MKI) 72-pin SIMMs Memories.

== Display ==
Main panel features a 64 x 240 pixels backlit display LCD screen.

== Notable users ==
- Jean-Michel Jarre
- Mike Patton
