= Roland SP-404 =

Discontinued electronic sampler

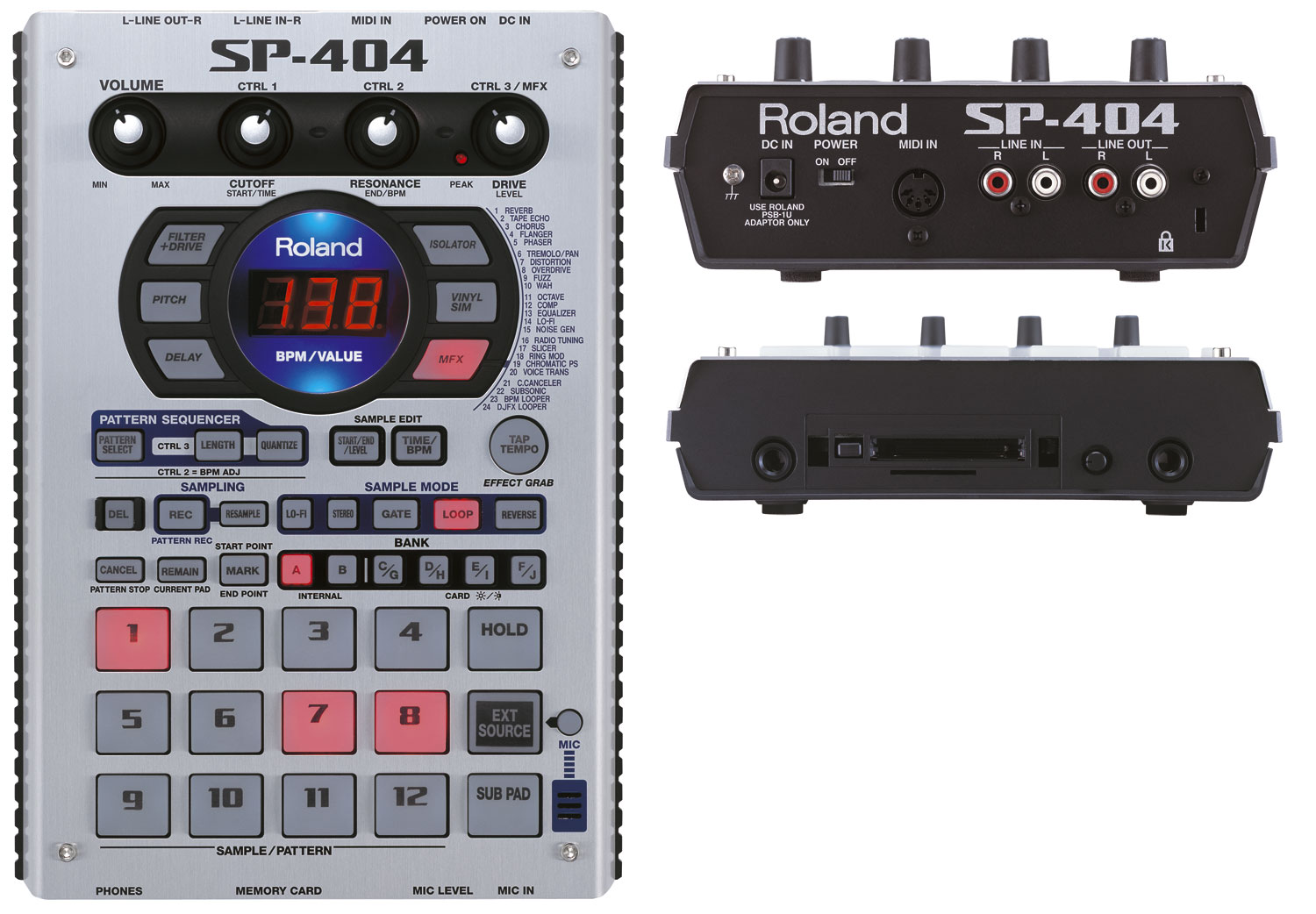
- Roland SP-404 Sampling Workstation
- Classification: Electronic sampler
- Developed: Roland Corporation (2005)

The Roland SP-404 Sampling Workstation is a sampler made by Roland Corporation. Released in 2005, it is part of the SP family of products and is the successor to Boss Corporation’s SP-505 sampler. The sampler was succeeded by the SP-555 in 2008, but was later given its own upgrade as the Roland SP-404SX Linear Wave Sampler in 2009. Another upgrade, the Roland SP-404A Linear Wave Sampler, was released in 2017. A third upgrade, the SP-404MKII was released in 2021. The Roland SP-404 has played a huge role in influencing the sound of the popular hip-hop sub-genre known as lofi hip-hop.

== History ==
The Roland SP-404 was developed as a succession to previous installments in the SP family, particularly the Boss SP-303. Its design, which features 12 pads, and its effects that were available on previous models, were introduced as selling points.

The SP-404 was purportedly first used on an official release by Jneiro Jarel, on his LP Three Piece Puzzle. The growth of the SP-404 was propelled by the weekly club night Low End Theory, which was founded in 2006 and consistently featured artists such as Flying Lotus and Samiyam. Its usage became frequent in hip-hop produced during the mid 2000s, with producers such as Teebs repurposing the sampler as a field recorder. Roland, in recent years, has celebrated April 4th as "404 Day", which celebrates the creation of the sampler and its continued effects on modern hip-hop.

== Features ==
SP Lineage

The following list is a correct order of each installment's release, as an attempt to help musicians avoid any confusion.

- Boss SP-202 (1998)
- Roland SP-808 GrooveSampler (1998)
- Roland SP-808EX E-Mix Studio (2000)
- Boss SP-303 (2001)
- Boss SP-505 (2002)
- Roland SP-606 Sampling Workstation (2004)
- Roland SP-404 (2005)
- Roland SP-555 (2008)
- Roland SP-404SX (2009)
- Roland SP-404A (2017)
- Roland SP-404MKII (2021)

=== OG / SX / A ===
Having the traditional features of the Roland Grooveboxes, the 404 has the ability to record audio directly via line/mic, or import/export industry-standard WAV and AIF files via CompactFlash card. An onboard pattern sequencer allows up to 8,000 notes to be recorded in real time.

Pattern data can be quantized and up to 24 patterns, each 1–99 measures long, can be stored in the internal memory. Using a 1GB CompactFlash card, sampling times can be as long as approximately 772 minutes in Lo-Fi mode, or up to 386 minutes long in Standard mode.

However, the 404 (along with its own upgrades) lacks the D-Beam feature of the previous SP-808 and SP-606 installments. Although the first bank comes with preset samples that are protected, these samples can be removed by holding "cancel" as you turn it on. This allows you to delete the samples from the protected bank.

The release of the 404SX in 2009 introduced the change from CompactFlash cards to SD cards, along with additional features, faster processing and changes to the in-built quantization system. The 404A introduced cross-compatibility with the Roland TR-8.

=== MKII ===
Released in 2021, the 404MKII was a significant upgrade, while retaining the unit's original form factor. Among the new features were an extra four pads for a total of 16, an OLED display capable of showing sample waveforms, 16 GB of internal memory, USB-C and 32-note polyphony. The device was also given a new "Skip Back Sampling" feature with the addition of a "Mark" Button. This feature provides users the option to record the most recent 40 seconds of usage with the press of the button. In 2023 was released a Stone Throw Records Limited Edition.

== In popular culture ==
A number of musicians have used either the SP-303 and/or the SP-404 as part of their production and performance.

These include Jel, Odd Nosdam, Alias, J Dilla, Madlib, JPEGMAFIA, Joji, MF Doom, Jneiro Jarel, Milo, Flying Lotus, James Blake, Samiyam, Ras G, Teebs, Grimes, Pictureplane, Four Tet, Beck Hansen, Antonio Planta, Bradford Cox of Deerhunter and Atlas Sound, Radiohead, Animal Collective, Spindrift, Toro y Moi, Broadcast, John Maus, Ellie Goulding, El Guincho, Illmind, Dibia$e, Jim James of My Morning Jacket, Oneohtrix Point Never (Daniel Lopatin), Matt Mondanile of Ducktails, Devo, Mad Professor, and many others.
