= Lofi hip-hop =

Subgenre of hip-hop

- Other names: Chillhop
- Stylistic origins: Downtempo; jazz rap; instrumental hip-hop; electronic; lo-fi; chill-out; alternative hip-hop; jazz; soul; easy listening
- Cultural origins: Early 2000s – late 2010s

Other topics
- Trip hop; Glitch-hop; Illbient; Lofi Girl

Lofi hip-hop (also known as chillhop) is a style of lo-fi music that combines hip-hop beats with elements of chill-out. The word lofi (also typeset as lo-fi, short for "low fidelity"), refers to the unpolished production techniques common in the style. It was popularized in the 2010s on YouTube.

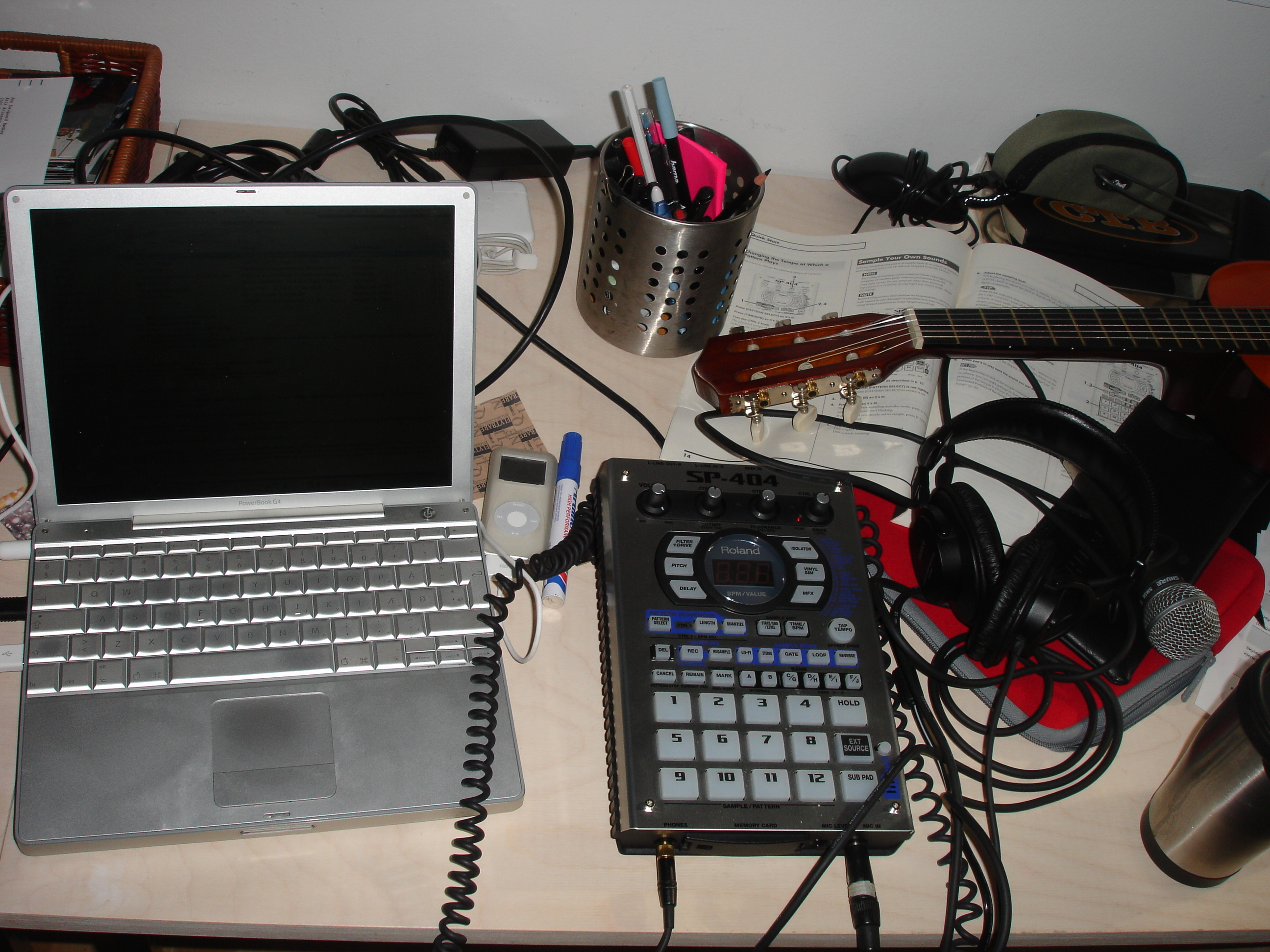
An example of a lo-fi equipment setup, including the genre's popular Roland SP-404 sampler.

== Characteristics ==
Lofi hip-hop, or chillhop, uses "downtempo, fuzzed-out atmospheric beats" along with samples from sources like retro video games, old cartoons, self-help tapes and public access television.

According to Phillip Sherburne of Pitchfork, the genre is characterized by "poky tempos, cloying piano or guitar melodies, ersatz vinyl hiss, and other signifiers of inoffensive chill." Sherburne also stated that the genre is "the musical equivalent of a white-noise coloring book."

== Etymology ==
The genre name originates from the low fidelity ("lo-fi") aesthetic of the music, which tends to be deliberately less "polished" than high fidelity ("hi-fi") music and features audio imperfections, distorted sound quality, and less professional audio equipment. Lo-fi hip-hop originated within the underground beatmaking hip-hop scene of the 2000s, particularly after the advent of Roland SP-303 and Roland SP-404 samplers, each of which featured the "lo-fi" effect as a separate button.

The 2004 MF Doom and Madlib album Madvillainy is regarded as a "shared touchstone" for lo-fi hip-hop. The Japanese artist Nujabes, often called the "godfather of lofi hip-hop", is also credited with driving lofi's growth with his contributions to the soundtrack for the popular anime Samurai Champloo. Another artist also often associated with the development of lofi is US rapper and producer J Dilla.

== History ==
In 2013, YouTube began hosting live streams, which resulted in 24-hour "radio stations" dedicated to microgenres such as vaporwave. Compilation videos are also popular, combining the music with visuals that could take the form of recorded pedestrian walks through major cities like Tokyo, looping visuals from cartoons such as The Simpsons or Internet memes. Spotify added to the popular "lo-fi beats" wave by generating "Spotified genres", including "Chill Hits", "Bedroom Pop" playlists, and promoting numerous "chill pop" artists.

In 2015, a form of downtempo music tagged as "chillhop" or "lo-fi hip-hop" became popular among YouTube music streamers. Most, if not all, of the content used in YouTube videos was primarily published on SoundCloud. By 2018, several of these channels had millions of followers. One DJ, Ryan Celsius, theorized that they were inspired by a nostalgia for the commercial bumpers used by Toonami and Adult Swim in the 2000s, and that this "created a cross section of people that enjoyed both anime and wavy hip-hop beats". These channels equally functioned as chatrooms, with participants often discussing their personal struggles. By 2018, Spotify's "Chill Hits" playlist had 5.4 million listeners and had been growing rapidly.

Winkie credited YouTube user Lofi Girl (formerly known as "ChilledCow") as "the person who first featured a studious anime girl as his calling card, which set up the aesthetic framework for the rest of the people operating in the genre". Lo-fi as a genre builds upon two subgenres: hip-hop and ambient, both of which create a calm experience, common for studying or relaxation.

Viewership of lo-fi hip-hop streams grew significantly during the COVID-19 pandemic. In April 2020, MTV News noted, "there might be something to be said for lo-fi hip-hop's composition, and the way its creators mix simplistic melodies with a judicious use of words to create intense memories, feelings, and nostalgia" and stated that the quarantine in place in various countries "has led people to log more hours online due to boredom or virtual workplaces and schools, and livestreamed music performances are reaching their full potential". Most listeners of the genre classify as University students due to their "profound interest in relaxation and emotional exploration" as well as the genre's relaxing nature.

In July 2025, music journalist Kieran Press-Reynolds, writing for Pitchfork reported that musicians within the genre have suffered from lost revenue and "alienation" due to the effects of artificial intelligence on the music industry.
