= Roland SP-808 =

Musical workstation

Roland SP-808 Groove Sampler Roland SP-808EX E-Mix Studio
- Classification: Electronic sampler
- Developed: Groovesampler 1998; E-Mix Studio 2000

The Roland SP-808 GrooveSampler and SP-808EX/E-Mix Studio are both discontinued workstations, which function as digital samplers, synthesizers, and music sequencers. The digital samplers are a part of the long line of both Roland Corporation's and Boss Corporation's Groove Gear, which includes the more popular and successful Boss SP-303 and Roland SP-404 versions.

== Background ==
Being an early installment in the SP lineage, the SP-808 GrooveSampler was originally released in the year of 1998. Sometime in the year 2000, the sampler was updated, redesigned, and released as the SP-808EX, with the additional name of "e-Mix Studio." Despite receiving an upgrade, both versions of the SP-808 have and also lack certain features of the succeeding SP installments.

== Features ==
SP Lineage

The following list is a correct order of each SP installment's release, as an attempt to help musicians avoid any confusion.

- Boss SP-202 (1998)
- Roland SP-808 GrooveSampler (1998)
- Roland SP-808EX E-Mix Studio (2000)
- Boss SP-303 (2001)
- Boss SP-505 (2002)
- Roland SP-606 (2004)
- Roland SP-404 (2005)
- Roland SP-555 (2008)
- Roland SP-404SX (2009)
- Roland SP-404A (2017)
- Roland SP-404MKII (2021)

=== Groovesampler ===
The original Roland SP-808 GrooveSampler can play up to four stereo samples simultaneously, with the sample rates of 44.1 and 32 kHz. The maximum sample time allowed is 25 minutes of stereo at the rate of 44.1 kHz. Being a predecessor to more popular SPs, the sampler itself can hold over 1,000 samples, while 100MB Zip disks can store up to 1024 samples, roughly amounting to 64 minutes. Unlike some of the succeeding SP installments, the sampler has no USB or CompactFlash card option. Furthermore, audio samples can only be stored, read, and transferred directly from the zip drive rather than internal RAM. In an effort to maximize storage space on zip disks, Roland decided against the use of AIFF and WAV audio formats. D-Beam controller is also included.

=== E-Mix Studio ===
Being an upgrade from the Groovesampler, the SP-808EX E-Mix Studio includes a virtual monophonic synthesizer for use with the step sequencer and D-Beam controller. Vocal effects, guitar multi-effects, a 10-band Vocoder, Voice Transformer, Mic Simulator, and a number DJ-oriented groove effects were added as well. A larger 250MB Zip drive replaces the original 100MB Zip. Sampling and recording time was extended possible to 61 stereo minutes. Expansion options include the OP-1 interface (6 analog outs, 2 digital I/Os, SCSI) and OP-2 interface (XLR I/Os, digital I/O, SCSI). In regards to storing and transporting audio, the method is the same as the Groovesampler.

== Notable users ==
Despite receiving little popularity in comparison to the later SP-303 and SP-404 installments, Slipknot member 133 is known to have utilized the sampler for a number of years. DJ and music producer, Rekha Malhotra is known for utilizing the SP-808 as well.
