= Boss SP-202 =

Sampling workstation

The Boss Dr. Sample SP-202 is a discontinued sampling workstation made by Boss Corporation, a division under Roland Corporation. Released in the year of 1998, it is the premier installment to the SP family, which includes Boss's popular SP-303 and Roland's SP-404 installments. The sampler is also successor to Roland's MS-1 Digital Sampler.

== Features ==
SP Lineage

The following list is a correct order of each SP installment's release, as an attempt to help musicians avoid any confusion.

- Boss SP-202 Dr Sample (1998)
- Roland SP-808 GrooveSampler (1998)
- Roland SP-808EX E-Mix Studio (2000)
- Boss SP-303 (2001)
- Boss SP-505 (2002)
- Roland SP-606 (2004)
- Roland SP-404 (2005)
- Boss SP-555 (2008)
- Roland SP-404SX (2009)
- Roland SP-404A (2017)
- Roland SP-404MKII (2021)

Being an early installment, the SP-202 has a limited number of features which were later improved and expanded on through future installments/upgrades of the SP lineage:

- eight large pads, four banks, two control knobs, with overall display and operation that was later enhanced with the Boss SP-303
- Compact, easy-to-use portable sampler—perfect for club DJs, hip-hop and dance music artists, and other sampling musicians
- Innovative BPM function calculates BPM from sample length for easy looping*
- six built-in effects including Pitch Shift, Filter 1 & 2, Time Stretch, Delay, Ring Modulation
- Sampling time — 4 min. 20 sec. internal, up to 37 min. using optional 5 volt SmartMedia card (2mb or 4mb supported)
- User-selectable sampling grade programmable for each pad
- Built-in microphone for sampling any time, any place
- Import/export WAV/AIF via SmartMedia card slot
- Runs on battery or AC power

== Musicians ==
A number of musicians have used the SP-202 as part of their production and performance. Several artists include Fatboy Slim, as well as Tobacco.
