= Harry Mendell =

American inventor and computer designer

- Education: University of Pennsylvania, 1976
- Occupation: Inventor of first digital sampling synthesizer
- Spouse: Elizabeth Olshin
- Relatives: son, Harris Mendell

Harry Mendell is an American inventor and computer designer. In the 1970s and 1980s he worked in electronics, specifically with computers and music. He invented the first digital sampling synthesizer. The American musician Stevie Wonder bought Mendell's invention, the Computer Music Melodian and used it on a documentary soundtrack and corresponding soundtrack album inspired by the book The Secret Life of Plants. Wonder worked with Mendell for almost a decade, including almost all the tracks that are on the soundtrack album The Woman in Red, for which Mendell won a Platinum record. Mendell also worked with Bon Jovi.

In the late 1980s onwards, Mendell moved into conceptualizing and designing computer algorithms for international finance, and became an expert on global risk management, research in the financial field, as well as machine learning and natural language processing.

== 1970s ==
As an undergraduate at the University of Pennsylvania in the 1970s, Mendell took a course during which he studied the Moog synthesizer, an analog synthesizer. He became curious about how a synthesizer could be adapted to computing. His university thesis was on computer vision, and he designed a solid-state imaging system, which was one of the first to be invented. Mendell graduated from the University of Pennsylvania in 1976, and at about the same time he invented the first digital sampling synthesizer, while working at the Annenberg Center for Communication.

At Bell Labs from 1976 to 1984, Mendell worked as part of a group developing the Unix system; commenting about this research in the 2013 University of Pennsylvania interview, he said, "I actually developed a chip for managing memory, and it's still the same system they use."

== 1980s ==
In 1980, on National Public Radio, Mendell was interviewed about the "Computer Music Melodian", his digital sampling synthesizer. This consisted of a small computer attached to a synthesizer, an amplifier, and a tape deck; Mendell commented, "It can take any sound, and it can store that sound in its memory, and then it can sound like whatever you entered into it. So it can sound like any musical instrument, or it can take sounds which aren't from music instruments, like a bird singing, and make that into a musical instrument." When asked what the Melodian could be used for, Mendell explained that, "A good example is what Stevie Wonder did with it in "The Secret Life of Plants"; he wanted to be able to have birds singing a melody which he wrote." Mendell was referring to the 1979 soundtrack album Stevie Wonder's Journey Through "The Secret Life of Plants". The Melodian plays a major role in the track "Don't Drive Drunk", which was used in a public service announcement on nationwide television.

In 1984, The New York Times featured an article about two new electronic instruments that were each a keyboard and software combination, designed to work with a home computer, the Commodore 64. One of the two instruments reviewed was Mandell's "Melodian". The review noted that the Melodian had a keyboard of nearly three and a half octaves, and could produce the sounds of 19 different musical instruments, "from the bagpipe to the violin, with calliope, flute, harpsichord, mandolin and organ, as well as various synthesizers and claviers". Also available was "RhythmMaster", a teaching tool to help a beginning musician with various aspects of performing and understanding music. The New York Times review said that RhythmMaster "is one piece of educational software that, unlike most of its kinfolk, actually delivers."

In 1987, The New York Times ran a long (988 word) article describing "the merging of digital audio recording technology with satellite telecommunications". In a recording session arranged by Mendell, the Kaufman Astoria Studios in Queens were linked with a studio in Los Angeles in real time, so that Stevie Wonder and producer Quincy Jones were able lay down a harmonica track played in Los Angeles onto a piece of music (the theme of the television series Moonlighting) in the New York City studio. Then in the same recording session, Nile Rodgers in Queens added guitar to Stevie Wonder's song, "Stop, Don't Pass Go" in Los Angeles.

Mendell worked with Bon Jovi on the 1986 album Slippery When Wet; on the album his name is listed in an acknowledgement.

== Late 1980s and 1990s ==
In about 1986, Mendell moved into working in the financial sector, creating algorithms for trading options and managing risk. In 1997, Mendell co-authored (with 15 other financial experts including Peter Carr, the first author) a scholarly article called "Towards a Theory of Volatility Trading"; the abstract includes the statement, "The primary purpose of this article is to review three methods which have emerged for trading realized volatility."

In approximately 1996, the website Risk.net published a news piece, "Morgan Stanley Enters 'Phase Two' Of Global Risk Strategy" which describes Mendell as "Morgan's head of global market risk technology". Mendell comments, "Understanding our risk is strategic to our business. We need to be extremely precise about risk." He explains that Morgan Stanley has developed the ability to do globally consolidated VAR calculation daily, and in phase two they would develop the ability to do those calculations in real time: "Without this type of analysis, you're really going by the seat of your pants to know what kind of exposure the firm is taking.".

== 2000s ==
In July 2001, Cambridge University Press published a hardback book (686 pages) called "Handbooks in Mathematical Finance: Option Pricing, Interest Rates and Risk Management". On page 475 in a chapter by P. Carr and D. Madan, there is an acknowledgement to Mendell (and 16 others) for "useful discussions".

In 2002, on the website GlobalInvestorMagazine.com an article entitled "On the Road with Apogee" asked, "What do Stevie Wonder, John Bon Jovi and hedge funds have in common?" and went on to explain that Mendell and his partner Sam Glassman had started a hedge fund, "Apogee Fund Management".

In May, 2003, a scholarly paper on "Trading Autocorrelation" by Peter Carr was published. Harry Mendell (and 11 others) were thanked in the paper for "helpful comments".

== Harris Mendell ==
Harry Mendell's son, Harris Mendell, is a musician, a singer/songwriter and guitarist in the band Sundials.
