= Roland MS-1 =

Electronic sampler released by Roland

Roland MS-1 Digital Sampler
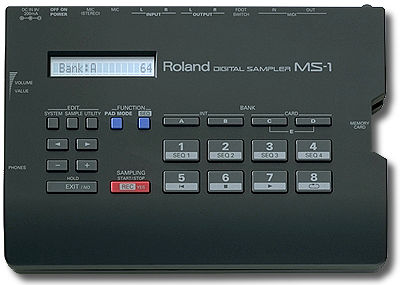
- Classification: Electronic sampler
- Developed: Roland Corp. Date: (1994-1998); OS: v1.12 (Stable Version); Price: £425 GBP (1995) $671 US (1995); Musicians: Sixtoo, Eliot Lipp

The Roland MS-1 digital sampler was a compact, 16-bit digital audio phrase sampler produced by Roland in 1994 as a straightforward, inexpensive, entry-level sampler. In 1998, the MS-1 was succeeded by the Boss SP-202 sampler.

== Overview ==
The MS-1 was what Roland refers to as a "phrase sampler" and featured eight rubber pads that triggered individual samples assigned to them. The eight pads were arranged into five banks for a total of 40 sampled sounds - 16 sounds (banks A & B) with the built-in flash memory and up to 24 (banks C, D & E) expanded with the insertion of a PCMCIA memory card. Without a card, only banks A & B could be used. Programming of the MS-1 was possible through the use of a small LCD and menu-driven settings entered with left and right directional buttons which increased or decreased numerical values and controlled a text editing cursor.

Sample time depended on the sample-rate quality that was selected during recording. The settings were simply called "High", "Standard," "Long-1," or "Long 2." The internal flash memory held approximately 20 seconds on the High setting, or nearly a minute on the Long-2 setting. Typically, Sandisk 2.5, 5 and 10 mega-byte memory cards were used with the MS-1 which increased sampling time and expanded its capabilities.

There were no built-in audio effects, but samples could be pitch controlled, playback start-and-end points could be edited, samples could be truncated allowing the deletion of audio bits that were not desired, samples could be divided and the split parts assigned to separate pads, and samples could be looped and loop start-and-end points could be edited. It also featured MIDI in and out, but no thru.

For recording audio, the MS-1 used left/right RCA jack audio inputs and two microphone jacks. It could sample in either mono or stereo and sampling quality could be reduced to allow more sampling time and the lower the setting, the grittier the digitized sounds became. Audio output was provided through a pair of left/right RCA output jacks and a headphone jack.

The MS-1 also featured a simple, single-track sequencer which triggered only the internal sounds. Up to four sequence patterns could be stored in memory to a total of 900 pad operations.

The machine was also portable and powered either by AC adapter or batteries.

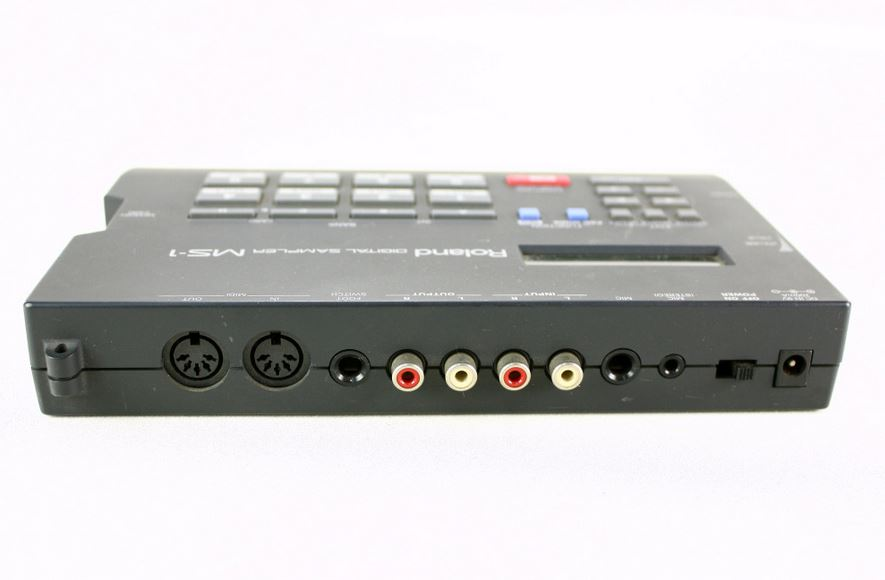
Rear view

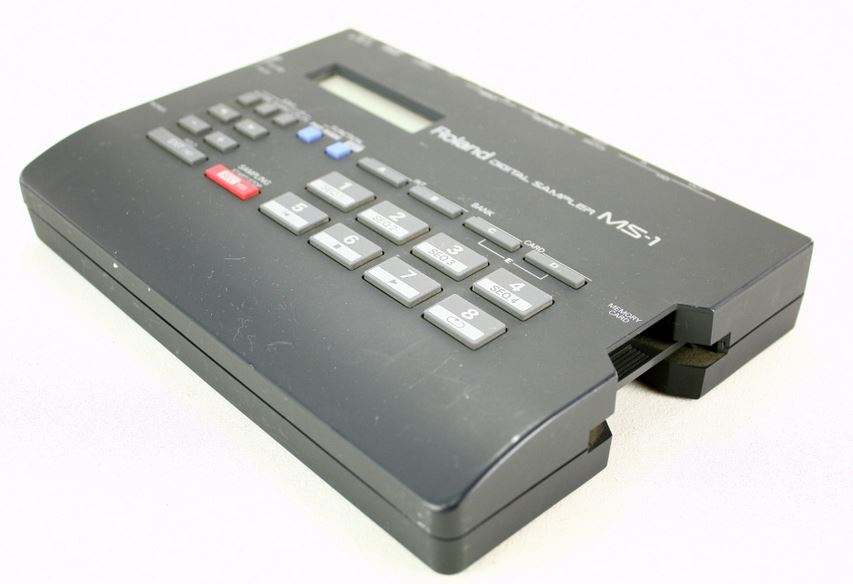
PCMCIA Slot view

== Features ==
- 16-bit stereo phrase sampler
- R-DAC (Roland digital audio coding)
- AD/DA conversion
- 8 onboard trigger pads
- 4 sampling frequencies
- • (High: 44.1–32.07 kHz)
- • (Standard: 32–23.27 kHz)
- • (Long-1: 22.05–16.04 kHz)
- • (Long-2: 16–11.64 kHz)
- Single-track sequencer
- RPS (real-time phrase sequencer)
- MIDI in/out
- Battery operation possible
- Flash ROM feature
- Bundled sampling CD

== See also ==
Boss SP-202
