= Boss SP-505 =

2002 Sampling workstation by Boss corporation

The BOSS SP-505 Groove Sampling Workstation/SP-505 is a sampling workstation made by Boss Corporation, which is a division of Roland Corporation. The digital sampler is part of the SP family and was released in the year of 2002, as a follow-up to Roland’s SP-303 installment. Ironically, both the 303 and 505 installments were succeeded by the release of Roland's SP-404 in the year of 2005.

== Features ==
SP Lineage

The following list is a correct order of each SP installment's release, as an attempt to help musicians avoid any confusion.

- Boss SP-202 (1998)
- Roland SP-808 GrooveSampler (1998)
- Roland SP-808EX E-Mix Studio (2000)
- Boss SP-303 (2001)
- Boss SP-505 (2002)
- Roland SP-606 (2004)
- Roland SP-404 (2005)
- Roland SP-555 (2008)
- Roland SP-404SX (2009)
- Roland SP-404A (2017)
- Roland SP-404MKII Creative Sample and Effector (2021)
- Having the traditional features of the Roland & Boss Grooveboxes, the 505 has the ability to record audio directly via line/mic, or import/export industry-standard WAV and AIF files via SmartMedia card.
- The SP-505’s internal memory provides over two minutes of CD-quality mono sampling, which can be expanded to over one hour using an optional 128MB SmartMedia card. The Smartmedia cards range from 8Mb to 128Mb.
- The interface design of the sampler consists of 16 large pads, and three control knobs. This design is now traditional to SP installments, with individual distinctions throughout installments.
- There are 64 onboard tones with drums, bass, keyboard, and also synth sounds.
- 29 effects like tape echo, isolator and vinyl simulator, that can be extensively utilized by resampling and realtime control.
- 1/4" microphone input for sampling
- CD-quality sound
- Chop function divides loops and maps individual samples to pads
- Pitch function for playing back samples at new pitches as on a keyboard
- BPM sync function instantly matches up to 16 phrases to the same tempo
- Sounds are imported by form of .WAV/AIFF files via SmartMedia, and by coaxial/optical digital inputs
- 8-voice polyphony (resample polyphony: 4 mono voices OR 1 stereo voice and 2 mono voices OR 2 stereo voices)
- Runs on AC power only (unlike other SP installments, there is no battery power option).

== Notable users ==
Despite not initially becoming as popular as the 303 and 404 installments, the 505 is well-associated with hip-hop producer Madlib.
