= Boss SP-303 =

Music workstation

Boss Dr. Sample SP-303
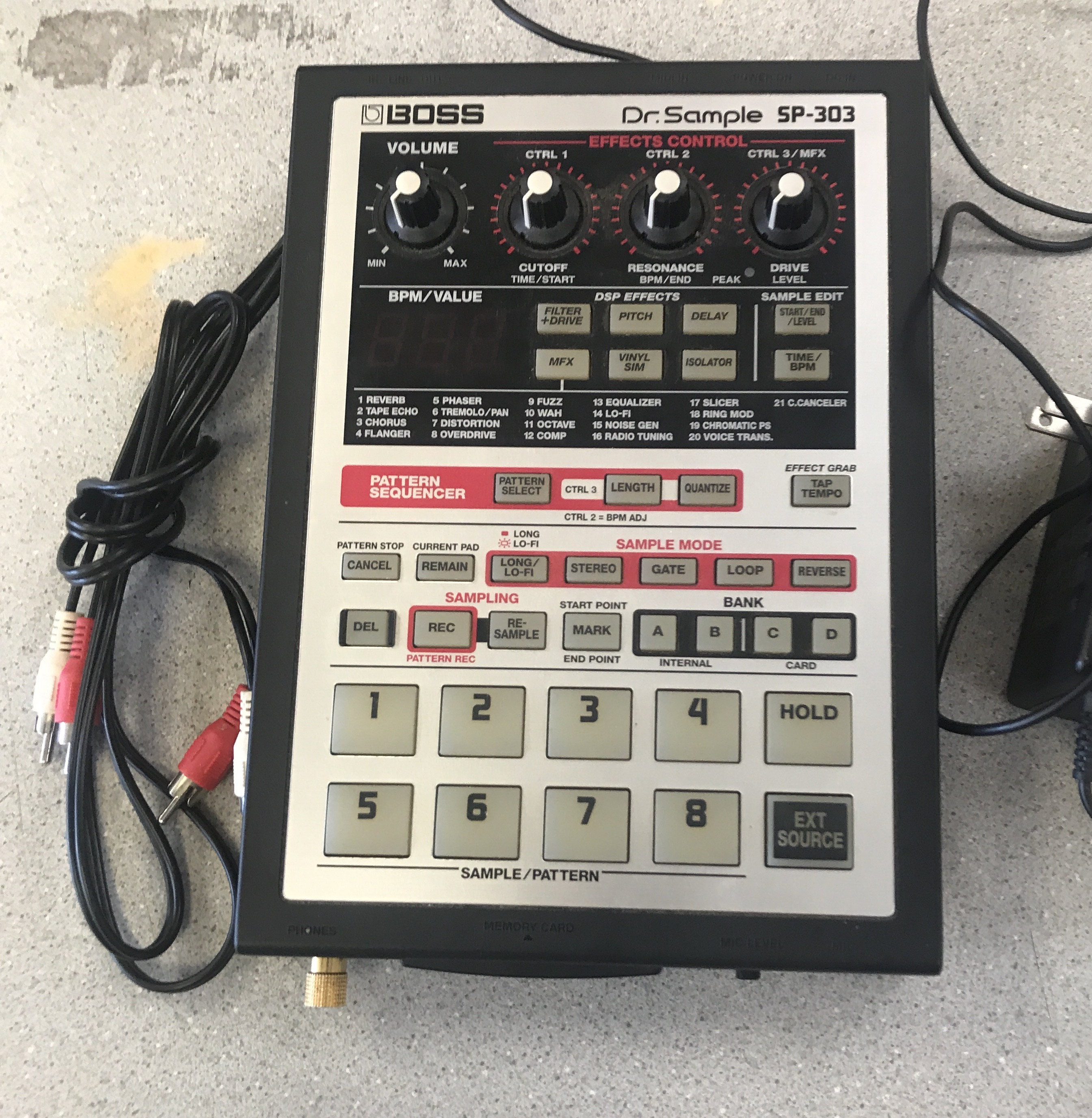
- Boss Dr. Sampler SP-303, with cords and adapter

Electronic instrument
- Other names: SP-303, 303
- Classification: Sampler, sequencer

The Boss Dr. Sample SP-303 is a discontinued digital sampler from Boss, successor of the Boss SP-202 Dr. Sample. The SP-303 was released in the year of 2001 and was revamped and redesigned in 2005, and released as the SP-404, by Roland Corporation.

== Features ==
While the Dr. Sample SP-303 may lack some of the features seen on other hip hop production samplers such as the Ensoniq ASR-10, the Akai MPC, and later SP installments, it however has many other unique features that make up for that. Like the SP-202, the SP-303 utilizes 8 pads, 4 soundbanks, and an external mic.

The sampler provides up to three minutes and twelve seconds of sampling. The sample time can be expanded by the use of SmartMedia cards (8MB-64MB supported). The SP-303 features twenty-six internal effects that can be applied to samples and external sources as well. Some of these effects are Filter + Drive, Pitch, Delay, Vinyl Sim, Isolator, Reverb, and Tape Echo. Another notable feature is the built-in pattern sequencer, where loops and patterns can be programmed.

== Musicians ==
SP Lineage

The following list is a correct order of each installment's release, as an attempt to help musicians avoid any confusion.

- Boss Dr. Sample SP-202 (1998)
- Roland SP-808 GrooveSampler (1998)
- Roland SP-808EX E-Mix Studio (2000)
- Boss Dr. Sample SP-303 (2001)
- Boss SP-505 (2002)
- Roland SP-606 (2004)
- Roland SP-404 Sampling Workstation (2005)
- Roland SP-555 (2008)
- Roland SP-404SX (2009)
- Roland SP-404A (2017)
- Roland SP-404MKII (2021)

The SP-303 is often praised by various musicians for its unique sound qualities, specifically its pitch and compression effects. Frequent SP-303 and 404 user Dibiase said of the sampler, "The difference between the 303 and SP-404 is that the vinyl sound compression sounds way different in the 303. It has a grittier sound."

The sampler has often been used live and in the studio by artists such as Animal Collective, Panda Bear, Four Tet, Moka Only, Madlib and J Dilla. Dilla famously used only the SP-303 and a 45 record player to create 29 of the 31 tracks from Donuts while hospitalized. Madlib produced most of the collaboration album Madvillainy, by using a Boss SP-303, a portable turntable, and a cassette deck. This including beats for "Strange Ways", "Raid", and "Rhinestone Cowboy", which were all produced in his hotel room in São Paulo.
