= Roland W-30 =

Digital sampling keyboard

W-30
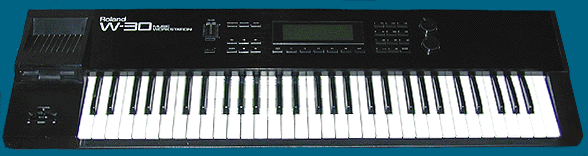
- Roland W-30
- Manufacturer: Roland Corporation
- Dates: 1989–1994
- Price: £1599 GBP

Technical specifications
- Polyphony: 16 voice
- Timbrality: 8
- LFO: Yes (sine peak-hold (with offset))
- Synthesis type: Samples
- Filter: TVF
- Attenuator: ADSR
- Aftertouch expression: Yes
- Velocity expression: Yes
- Storage memory: 15k steps, 20 songs disk: 100k steps, 64 songs
- Effects: No

Input/output
- Keyboard: 61 keys
- Left-hand control: Combined Pitch bend and modulation switch
- External control: MIDI In, out, thru

The Roland W-30 is a sampling workstation keyboard, released in 1989. It features an on-board 12-bit sampler, sample-based synthesizer, 16-track sequencer and 61-note keyboard.

== Overview ==
The W-30's "Workstation" title stems from its incorporation of synthesis, sampling and MIDI sequencing capabilities. Although primitive by modern standards, the W-30's onboard sequencer was a practical way to arrange music as opposed to a DAW.

Unusually, while sounds are sampled with 12-bit resolution, they are played back through a 16-bit D-A converter which, in theory at least, improves the sound quality. Nonetheless, the slightly "gritty" nature of the samples could be considered one of the instrument's charms.

The W-30 is compatible with the sound library of the Roland S-50, S330 & S550 dedicated samplers, which are now in the public domain.

== Expansion ==
The workstation's back panel features a blanking-plate labelled SCSI. This allowed the very rare "KW30 SCSI kit" upgrade to be fitted. The KW30 gave the W-30 the ability to behave as a SCSI Master device, and drive SCSI hard drives and CD-ROM players through a standard 25-pin SCSI cable. Copying samples to a SCSI hard drive (maximum usable capacity: 80Mb) dramatically reduces load time compared to the built-in 3.5" floppy disk drive.

== Notable users ==
- Erick Sermon
- Liam Howlett of The Prodigy used the W-30 as his main songwriting device until 1997's The Fat of the Land and on-stage as a master keyboard up until 2008
- Steve Hillier of Dubstar programmed the entirety of the band's first album Disgraceful on a W-30. It was retired for the band's first European tour in 1996
- Andrés Bobe of La Ley programmed the keyboards and sequences from 1990 to 1994, mostly for the album Doble Opuesto
- DJ Paul of Three 6 Mafia created the gritty, 90s proto-trap sound by re-sampling the groups' hooks to be used across many of their releases. DJ Paul still uses the W-30 to this day.
- Hiroyuki Iwatsuki used the W-30 to write the music for the SNES game Wild Guns.
- Luis Alberto Spinetta's 1991 album Pelusón of Milk was produced mostly on his W-30 at home, while "waiting for Vera", his daughter, to be born
- Project Pitchfork used it on the albums Dhyani, Lam-'Bras, Entities, Io, Alpha Omega.
- Jason Novak used the W-30 in the early years of Acumen Nation and DJ? Acucrack, and later Cocksure, with Chris Connelly.
- Matt Elliott as The Third Eye Foundation used the W-30 as a sampler and sequencer for his album Ghost.
