= Roland S-50 =

Sampler Keyboard

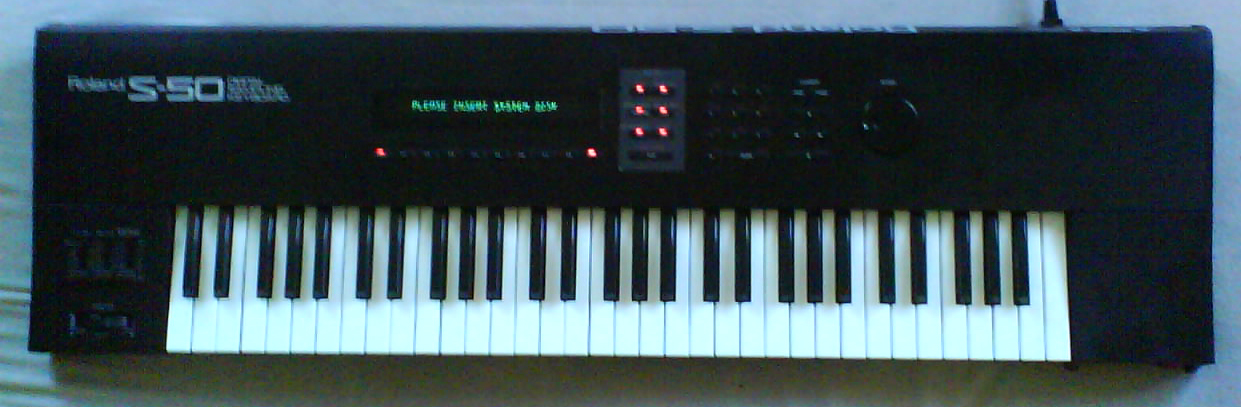
- Roland S-50
- Manufacturer: Roland Corporation
- Dates: 1986 - 1987
- Price: £2195 UK $2695 US

Technical specifications
- Polyphony: 16
- Timbrality: 4 parts
- LFO: Yes
- Synthesis type: Samples
- Filter: Low-pass, hi-pass digital filters
- Aftertouch expression: Yes
- Velocity expression: Yes
- Storage memory: RAM (512K)
- Effects: no

Input/output
- Keyboard: 61 keys (Weighted)
- Left-hand control: pitch-bend and modulation wheels, volume, record level, controller / bend range sliders.

The Roland S-50 is a 61-key 12-bit sampler keyboard produced by the Roland Corporation in 1986. It featured a 3.5-inch DSDD floppy disk drive and had external CRT monitor support to facilitate editing of samples. It could hold up to 32 samples. A rack-mounted version was also available, which featured expanded memory.

== Sample rate ==
15 to 30 kHz variable sampling rates at a 12-bit resolution, (28.8 seconds and 14.4 seconds respectively) The samples can also be saved to disk (3.5-inch DSDD floppy disk drive).

== S-550 ==
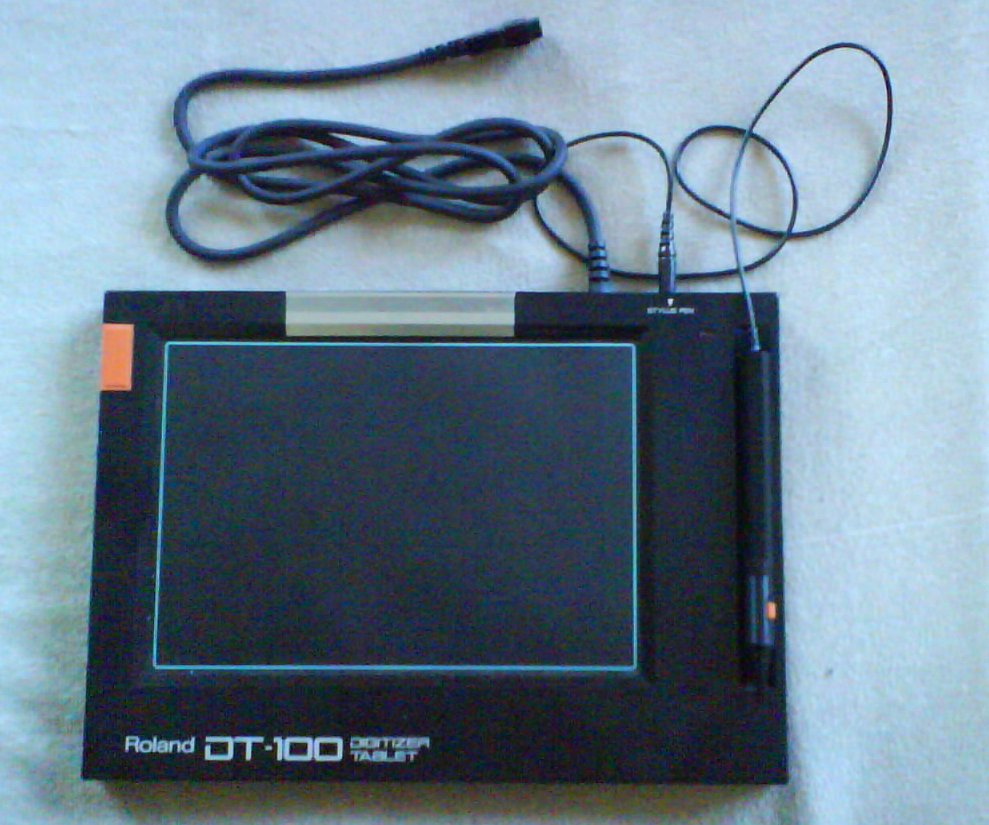
DT-100 Digitizer Tablet

A rack-mountable version was released in 1987, which also had twice the sample memory (1.5 Mb) and time-variant filters. A less feature-rich version of the S-550 was also available as the S-330. Both can support the DT-100 Digitizer Tablet and an external computer monitor for visual manipulation of the samples on screen.
