= D-Beam =

The D-Beam is a Roland synthesizers interface that can control and manipulate sound and effects via the user's hand movements interacting with an infrared beam of light.

== Background ==
The D-Beam was originally manufactured by Interactive Light, as a stand-alone unit, around 1996. It was then soon purchased by Roland Corporation, becoming trademarked and rebranded as D-Beam Controller for their own music equipment. It was then introduced on a larger scale through the Roland MC-505 in 1998, was further incorporated into a large number of Roland's grooveboxes, workstations, keyboards, and digital samplers over the years. The controller is usually mounted in the equipment's panel facing upwards, and senses the performer's hand (or other body part) at a height of up to 15" (~40 cm) or so above the device. Although controlled in a similar manner to a theremin, the operating principles are fundamentally different; the theremin uses capacitive sensing.
