= ARP Pro Soloist =

Monophonic analogue synthesizer

Pro Soloist
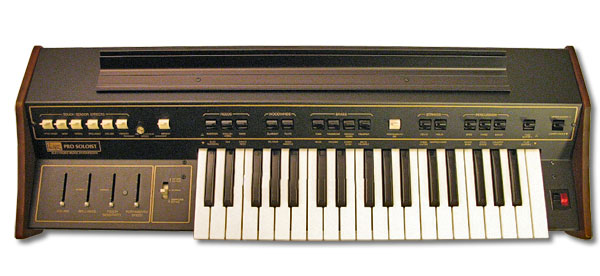
- ARP Pro Soloist
- Manufacturer: ARP Instruments, Inc.
- Dates: 1972 - 1977

Technical specifications
- Polyphony: Monophonic
- Timbrality: Monotimbral
- Oscillator: 1
- LFO: yes
- Synthesis type: Analog Subtractive
- Filter: 24dB/oct Low Pass, plus 14 fixed filters (Resonators)
- Attenuator: yes
- Effects: none

Input/output
- Keyboard: 37-key synth action with Aftertouch
- External control: none

The ARP Pro Soloist was one of the first commercially successful preset synthesizers. Introduced by ARP Instruments, Inc. in 1972, it replaced the similar ARP Soloist (1970–1971) in the company's lineup of portable performance instruments.

== History ==
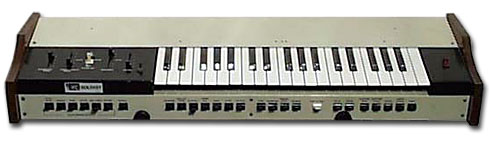
ARP Soloist

ARP Instruments, having developed the large and powerful ARP 2500 for studio work, released the Soloist as a light, portable, easy-to-use performance instrument that could be placed on top of an electric piano or electronic organ. In contrast to the flexible modular design of the 2500, the Soloist had no patch panels or cables. A set of toggle switches allowed the performer to quickly choose one of 18 preset monophonic patches that were not modifiable (note that "Voice" was ARP parlance for Preset, or Patch). This lack of programmability was compensated by giving the performer control over the voice expression, adding "growl", "wow", "brilliance", portamento, pitch bend, and/or vibrato to the timbre. A pressure-sensitive keyboard allowed players to use aftertouch to control all of these effects.

While moderately successful in its niche, the Soloist was not regarded as a serious synthesizer by most professional musicians. The limited set of voices, combined with tuning stability problems, kept it from wider use. Nevertheless, it found a place on recordings by such artists as Quincy Jones and Steely Dan. During the recording of Steely Dan's Countdown to Ecstasy (1973), Donald Fagen was so irritated with having to tune the Soloist so often, he threw it down the recording studio stairwell and jumped up and down on it. Shortly after, a producer joined in with some alcohol and they burned the ARP into a pile of melted plastic.

In 1972, ARP introduced the Pro Soloist, a revised and enhanced version of the Soloist. Expanding the number of preset patches to 30, and incorporating digital electronics for preset memory and keyboard control, it was much more reliable than the Soloist. A novel "digitized" tone generator eliminated tuning problems suffered by the Soloist. The voice selection tabs were now above the keyboard, instead of below as on the original Soloist.

Although initially marketed to home organists, it found its way into the hands of such famous musicians as Charles Earland, Tony Banks of Genesis, Josef Zawinul, Billy Preston, Vangelis, Tangerine Dream, Edgar Froese, Peter Baumann, Christopher Franke, Gary Numan (his 1980 number one album Telekon is heavily built on the Pro Soloist), Anthony Phillips (whose 1977 album The Geese and the Ghost took its name from Phillips' nicknames for two sounds produced by the Pro Soloist), John Entwistle, and Steve Walsh of Kansas (particularly on the 1975 release Song for America). Dennis DeYoung of Styx (used it through 1976 featured on the songs "Suite Madame Blue", "Crystal Ball" & "Man of Miracles"). Banks used the Pro Soloist prominently on the Genesis albums Selling England by the Pound (1973) through to Seconds Out (1977). It was also used by Funk keyboardist like Junie Morrison on the Ohio Players song "Funky Worm" and by Bernie Worrell in the Parliament Mothership Connection (1975) album. Around the same time, the company released its ARP Odyssey synthesizer, a powerful duophonic instrument, as the flagship of its performance line. The Pro Soloist offered an easier-to-use alternative which appealed to professionals as well as home users.

By the time the Pro Soloist caught on, many competitors such as Moog Music, Korg, Roland Corporation, and Farfisa had introduced similar keyboards, though, ironically, most of the competitors' clones had the voice selection tabs below the keyboard, like the original Soloist.

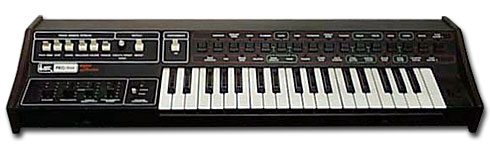
ARP Pro/DGX

The ARP Pro Soloist would eventually be reintroduced as the updated Pro-DGX featuring momentary digitally-latched push button voice selector switches with LED status indicators, rather than toggle switches. It would remain in production until the company's demise in 1981.

== Features ==
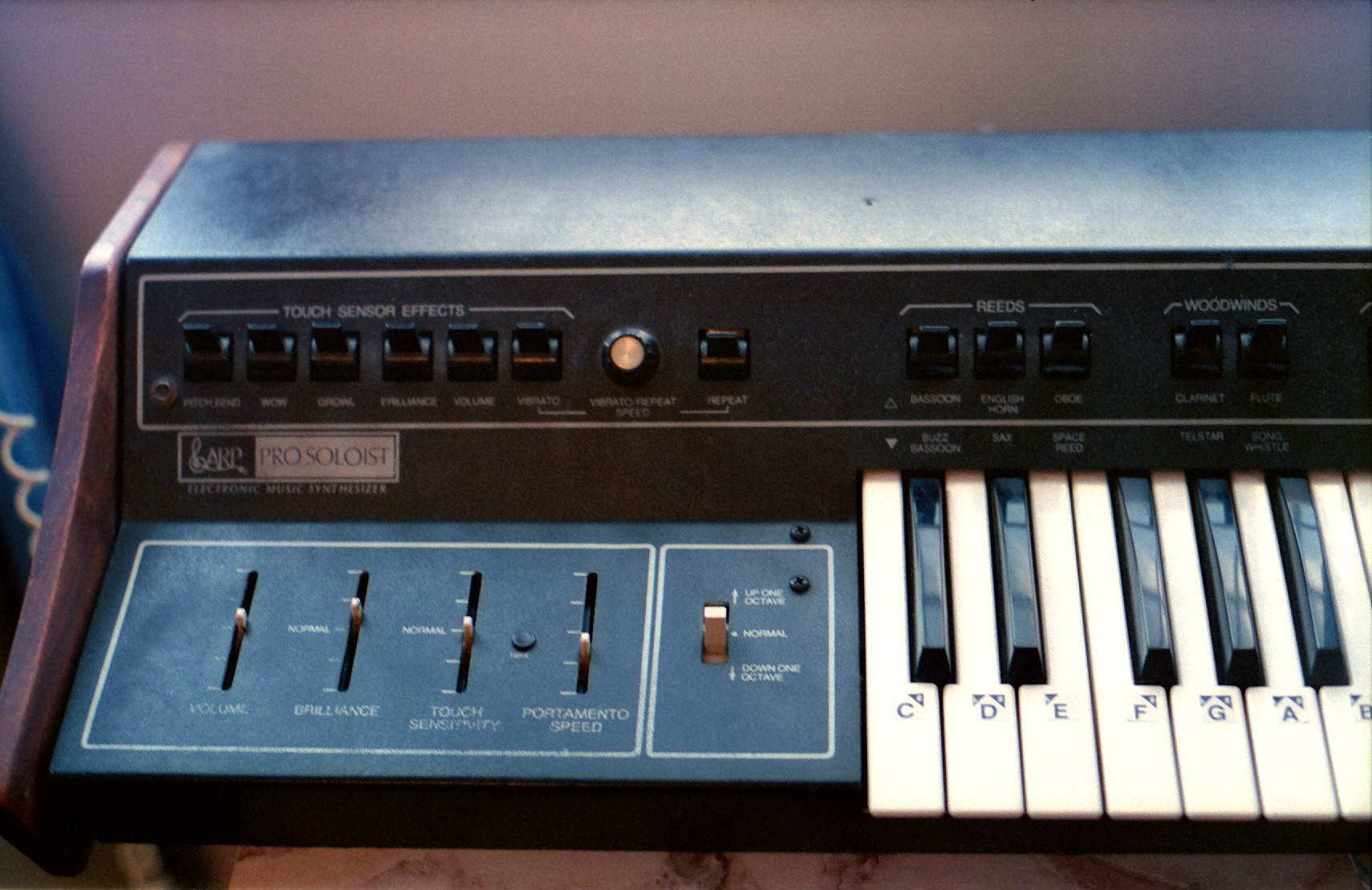
Sliders on ARP Pro-Soloist Keyboard

The Pro Soloist is monophonic and features a multiple-trigger, low note priority, transposable 37-key three-octave keyboard with aftertouch (i.e., pressure) sensitivity. The case is sheet metal with wooden side panels, and a fiberboard or Masonite bottom cover.

The Pro Soloist was significant in using digital read-only memory (ROM) chips to program all of its internal signal paths. The Voice selection switches deliver unique digital codes to set the ROMs' digital outputs, setting the parameters required for each circuit to produce the sound of the selected voice. The expression controls, including aftertouch, remain under analog control.

There are four slider pots to the left of the keyboard to control volume, touch sensitivity, brilliance (VCF Cutoff), and portamento speed during live performance. A 3-position octave switch allows "normal" or plus or minus one octave transposition of the 3-octave keyboard to extend the range of the instrument to five playable octaves; the total range of instrument across all presets covers 8 octaves. There is also a rotary pot which serves double duty to control both the rate of Vibrato or Tremolo (dependent upon preset) and Repeat, which causes the LFO to retrigger the envelopes of any selected voice upon key depression.

The Pro Soloist features a single oscillator, which generates simultaneously available pulse and sawtooth waveforms. The sawtooth wave is not a separate oscillator circuit, but instead is derived from the sum of 5 pulse waves, generating a 64-step "staircase" waveform to emulate a sawtooth pattern.

Pulse waves are generated at a very high frequency, seven or eight octaves higher than the pitch of the note being played. A digital code from the octave selector is combined with the key code and sent to a frequency divider, which outputs the correct sub-octave waveforms from the oscillator. The pulse oscillator provides pulse-width ratios of 1/14, 1/9, 1/64, and 2/11. A dynamic pulse width output adds harmonic expression to the attack and decay phase of some voices.

The output of the pulse and sawtooth waves can be directed through a saw/pulse mixer followed by a high-pass filter with four selectable settings. Additionally, the pulse output can be directed through one of three resonator banks. These banks (with 2, 3, and 5 settings respectively) can tailor the filtering of the waveform to suit specific voices (such as cello, violin, flute, or oboe). All of these settings are determined by the factory programmed ROMs; they are not accessible by the user.

Once the audio signal is routed through the mixer and resonators, it passes through a low-pass filter and amplifier each under the control of an attack-release (AR) or ADSR envelope generator, or both. The envelope settings, like all of the voice settings, are selected by the voice ROMs. The 24 dB/oct low-pass filter, ARP part no. 4034, was very similar to the Moog transistor-ladder filter, and was eventually replaced due to concerns around IP.

The output of the voice circuitry is routed to high- and low-impedance outputs for amplification.

A later instrument, the ARP Explorer (1974-1978), was similar to the Pro Soloist, but allowed basic modification of the voices beyond the presets programmed into the memory. Though much more flexible, the Explorer lacked the aftertouch feature that made the Soloist and Pro Soloist such expressive instruments.
