= Alan R. Pearlman =

American businessman and engineer (1925–2019)

- Born: Alan Robert Pearlman; June 7, 1925; New York City, New York, U.S.
- Died: January 5, 2019 (aged 93); Newton, Massachusetts, U.S.
- Occupation: Engineer
- Known for: Founder ARP Instruments

Alan Robert Pearlman (June 7, 1925 – January 5, 2019) was an American engineer best known as the founder of ARP Instruments, one of the early leading American synthesizer manufacturers.

== Early life ==
Pearlman was born in New York City on June 7, 1925. His father was a movie theatre projector designer and his grandfather made parts for phonograph machines. He grew up building radio sets, inspired by Popular Science and Popular Mechanics magazines, and served in the military briefly following World War II.

Following his military service, Pearlman attended Worcester Polytechnic Institute in Worcester, Massachusetts and in 1948, for his senior thesis designed a vacuum tube envelope follower that could extract the envelope of a sound from an instrument. He later audited a Harvard University course taught by one of the inventors of the transistor, Walter Brattain.

== Career ==
Pearlman spent five years designing amplifiers for NASA's Gemini and Apollo programs. He worked at George A. Philbrick Researchers with Roger Noble, and the two later founded analog module and op amp manufacturer Nexus Research Laboratory in Canton, Massachusetts in the early 1960s. Nexus Research Laboratory's business grew to $4 million in annual sales before being acquired by Teledyne, Inc. in 1966.

In 1969, Pearlman founded ARP Instruments, Inc. (originally Tonus, Inc.) with $100,000 of his own money and matching funds from a small group of investors. The name ARP was derived from Pearlman's initials and was his childhood nickname. ARP entered the fledgling synthesizer industry with the introduction of the ARP 2002, which, with twice as many switch rows on top, became the 2500 analog modular synthesizer. The 2002 was introduced at the Audio Engineering Society (AES) show in Fall 1970, and subsequently competed head-to-head with other leading synthesizer companies of the time. Pearlman eschewed patch cord methodology for interconnecting synthesizer modules, designing instead a system of sliding matrix switches. He also applied his op-amp experience by utilizing dual transistors on a single integrated circuit to overcome temperature gradients and provide very stable oscillators—more stable than other popular synthesizers on the market at the time, namely offerings from Moog Music and Buchla.

The company's next synthesizer, and one of its most popular and commercially successful, was the ARP 2600. The first units were manufactured in early 1971 in small quantities, but by the end of the year the 2600P model was in full production. Eschewing some of the more esoteric modules from the 2500, the 2600 was conceived as both a musical instrument and a didactic tool for learning about electronic music. Instead of the 2500's unreliable and arcane pin matrix, the 2600 used a more traditional patch cord routing architecture that provided users with a clear visual indication of signal flow. The 2600 was produced from 1971 until 1982, the year that ARP ceased to exist as a company.

ARP went public in 1973, based on the success of the 2600 and the ARP Odyssey. The company's annual sales peaked at $7 million in 1977, but differences of opinion in the management team, the costly development of the Avatar guitar synthesizer, and product sales figures that fell far short of the company's sales projections led to financial difficulties for the company and its eventual liquidation in September 1981. ARP's demise was financially devastating to Pearlman and his family, who together lost nearly $500,000 in cash and $1 million in paper assets.

Pearlman went on to found and serve as chief executive officer at Selva Systems Inc., a computer graphics software company. Later, Pearlman advised Way Out Ware's Jim Heintz on the development of the TimewARP 2600 software re-creation of the ARP 2600. This is the only ARP 2600 software re-creation that Pearlman endorsed.

== Awards ==
In 1978, Worcester Polytechnic Institute presented the Robert H. Goddard Alumni Award to Pearlman for professional achievement in his field.

At the AES convention in New York in October, 2010, Keyboard magazine editor-at-large Craig Anderton presented Alan R. Pearlman with a commemorative plaque naming him a "Keyboard Legend." Pearlman accepted with Jim Heintz of Way Out Ware, the developers of the TimewARP 2600, a software recreation of the ARP 2600 on whose development Pearlman consulted.

== Death ==
Pearlman died in Newton, Massachusetts, on January 5, 2019, at the age of 93.
