= ARP Pro/DGX =

Monophonic analogue synthesizer

Pro-DGX
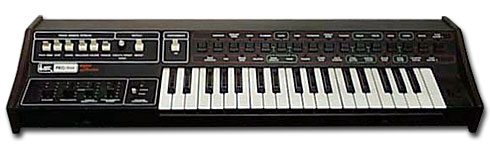
- ARP Pro/DGX
- Manufacturer: ARP Instruments, Inc.
- Dates: 1977 - 1981

Technical specifications
- Polyphony: Monophonic
- Timbrality: Monotimbral
- Oscillator: 1
- LFO: yes
- Synthesis type: Analog Subtractive
- Filter: 24dB/Oct Resonant Low Pass
- Attenuator: yes
- Aftertouch expression: yes
- Velocity expression: no
- Storage memory: 30 preset
- Effects: yes

Input/output
- Keyboard: 37 key
- External control: Portamento; Footswitch

The ARP Pro/DGX is a preset-based monophonic synthesizer manufactured by ARP Instruments, Inc. from 1977 until the company's demise in 1981.

Like its predecessor, the Pro Soloist, it features 30 presets and aftertouch. In fact, it looks almost identical to the Explorer and Pro Soloist. However, there are some notable differences. The Pro/DGX was housed in a new steel chassis, which was much sturdier than that of the Pro Soloist. Presets were now accessed via digitally latched momentary pushbuttons with LED indicators, as opposed to the more retro, flapper-style toggle switches used in the Pro Soloist.

The first run of this synth looks very much like the Pro Soloist in layout and colour scheme, though subsequently, it was produced using ARP's late-1970s Orange and Black colour scheme, like the Quadra and Odyssey Mk-3.

The presets on the Pro/DGX are identical to those found on the Pro Soloist. However, it does sound slightly different, due to the implementation of a new filter design. Many describe the sound of the Pro/DGX as warm, and compare it favourably to its predecessor. However, some say it lacks the quality of the Pro Soloist filter, perhaps less "organic".

== Preset sounds ==
Bassoon, English Horn, Oboe, Clarinet, Flute, Tuba, Trombone, French Horn, Trumpet, Cello, Violin, Bass, Piano, Banjo, Fuzz, Guitar 1, Buzz Bassoon, Sax, Space Reed, Telstar, Song Whistle, Noze, Pulsar, Comic Wow, Mute Trumpet, Steel Guitar, Harpsichord, Space Bass, Steel Drum, Country Guitar, Fuzz Guitar 2

== Notable users ==
- Tangerine Dream
- Keane
- Wings
- Tony Banks (Genesis)
- Steve Walsh (Kansas)
- Los Bukis
- Jacno
- Iasos_(musician)
