= Blue veil =

Blue veil may refer to:

- Blue veil, symbol of women's piety, sacrifice and observance, see Daughters of Divine Love

== Paintings ==
- The Blue Veil (Ingres), 1821 religious work, by French Neoclassical painter Jean-Auguste-Dominique Ingres
- The Blue Veil (Tarbell), 1898 work by American Impressionist painter Edmund C. Tarbell
- Blue Veil (Scobel), 2003–04 work by American painter Jenny Scobel

== Film and television ==
- The Blue Veil (1941 film), Czech drama
- The Blue Veil (1942 film), French drama
- The Blue Veil (1951 film), American adaptation of French drama
- "The Blue Veil" (Danger Man), a 1960 television episode

== Literature ==
- The Blue Veil or The Crime of the Tower, 1885 novel by French author Fortuné du Boisgobey
- Blue Veil (novel), 1961 adventure novel by Trevor Maine, one of the pen names Arthur Catherall

== Music ==
- Blue Veil (album), 2025 album by Lucy Railton
- "Blue Veil", 2010 musical meditation by John Zorn; on Nova Express (album)
- "Blue Veil", rock band from Patras, Greece, formed in 2009. Their debut album "6 Degrees of Separation" was released in October 2017.

== See also ==
- Blue Veils and Golden Sands, 2002 BBC radio play
