= Abandon Normal Devices =

British digital arts organisation

Observatory Cinema at Bidston Observatory during AND Festival 2021. Photograph by Chris Foster.

Abandon Normal Devices (AND) is a Manchester-based digital arts organisation established in 2009 through a partnership by FACT Liverpool and HOME (Manchester), producing site-specific digital and new media art projects across the North of England.

== AND Festival ==
The organisation's core activity is AND Festival, a nomadic site-specific digital arts event first launched in Liverpool in 2009. In its initial years, the festival alternated between Manchester and Liverpool, presenting exhibitions, screenings and performances across sites in each host city. Subsequent editions have been hosted by different partner institutions and have extended into rural and post-industrial locations in the North of England, including Grizedale Forest, the Peak District and along the Manchester Ship Canal and River Mersey.

Notable commissioned artists and projects include Apichatpong Weerasethakul, The Yes Men in its early editions, and later Oneohtrix Point Never’s Suite from Magnetic Rose in Manchester in 2014, Marshmallow Laser Feast In the Eyes of the Animal in 2015, Daan Roosegaarde's Waterlicht in 2017, and Kali Malone’s immersive sound installation Does Spring Hide Its Joy in Birkenhead Docks in 2021, which was later developed into Malone's 2023 album of the same name.

In September 2026, the tenth edition of AND Festival took place in Barnsley, South Yorkshire, marking the festival’s first edition in Yorkshire.
