= ARP 2600 =

Analog synthesizer

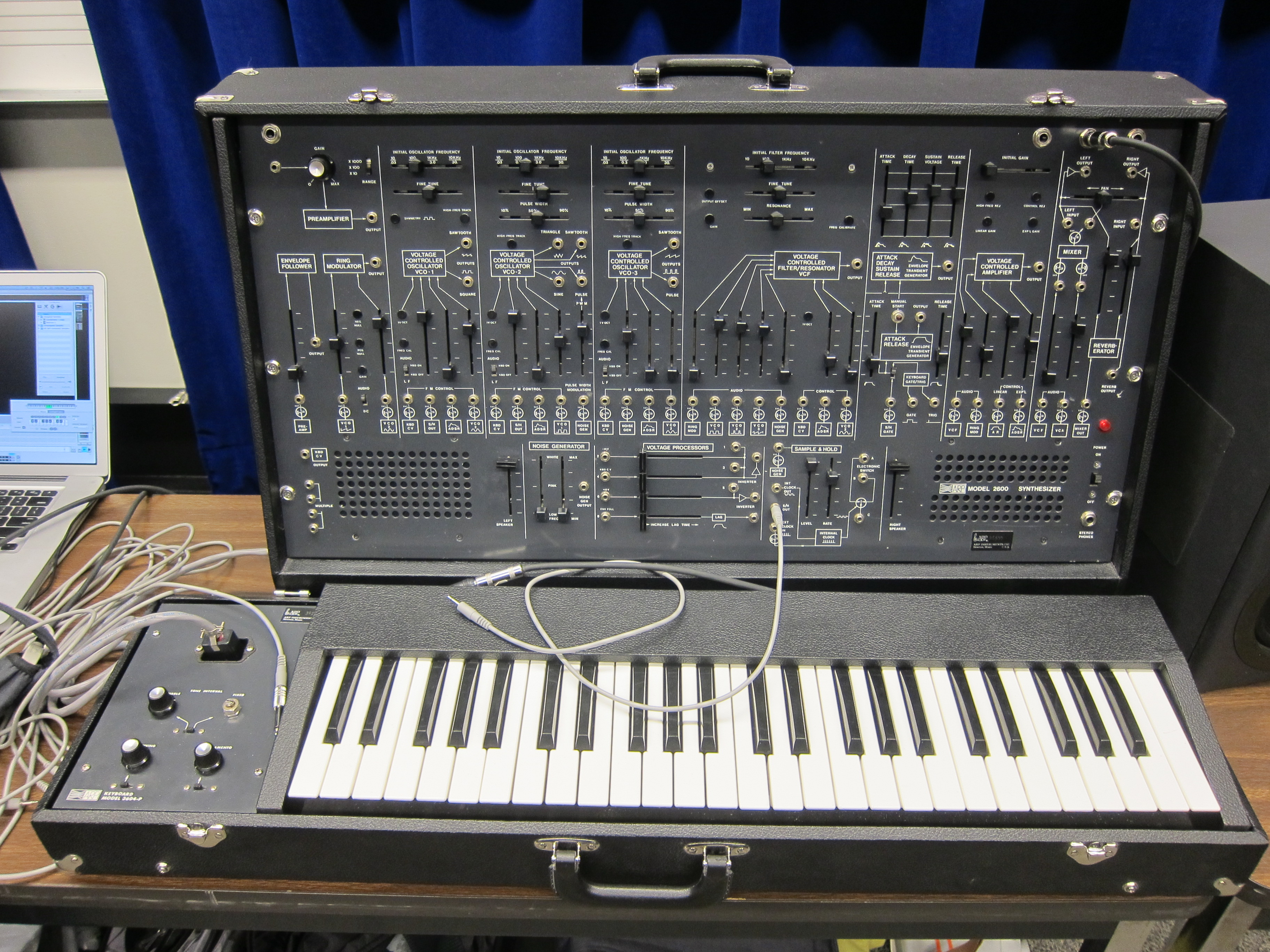
- Manufacturer: ARP Instruments
- Dates: 1971-81, 2020

Technical specifications
- Polyphony: Monophonic
- Timbrality: Monotimbral
- Oscillator: 3
- LFO: 1
- Synthesis type: Analog subtractive
- Filter: 24 dB/octave low-pass (1)
- Attenuator: ADSR and AR
- Aftertouch expression: None
- Velocity expression: None
- Storage memory: None
- Effects: Spring reverberator

Input/output
- Keyboard: 49
- External control: CV/Gate

The ARP 2600 is an analog synthesizer first produced by ARP Instruments from 1971 to 1981.

== History ==
Developed by a design team headed by ARP namesake Alan R. Pearlman and engineer Dennis Colin, the ARP 2600 was introduced in 1971 as the successor to ARP's first instrument, the ARP 2500, at a retail price of $2600 (equivalent to $21,200.00 in January 2026).

Unlike fully modular synthesizers such as the ARP 2500, which often required modules to be purchased individually and wired by the user, the 2600 is semimodular, with a fixed selection of basic synthesizer components internally prewired with connections that can be altered with patch cords. It features clear text labels and front panel graphics indicating the functions of different sections and the signal flow between them. On its initial release it was heavily marketed to high schools and universities.

== Features and architecture ==
The ARP 2600 features three voltage-controlled oscillators, a 24 dB/octave low-pass filter, a voltage-controlled amplifier, a ring modulator, a sample-and-hold unit, a white/pink noise generator, a microphone preamplifier, a spring reverberation unit, two envelope generators, and a four-octave keyboard controller.

In 1973, Tom Oberheim, who was an ARP dealer, produced a kit that converted the keyboard into a duophonic keyboard capable of triggering two different oscillators simultaneously. The 3604 keyboard used the same circuit board as the earlier 2500 keyboard, but ARP did not fit the duophonic components. The following year, ARP adopted this improvement and introduced the Model 3620 duophonic keyboard, which also included a low-frequency oscillator for vibrato and single and multiple triggering functionality.

All versions of the ARP 2600 produced through 1976 used ARP's 4012 filter submodule, which was an imitation of Robert Moog's transistor ladder filter. This became the subject of a patent dispute eventually settled out of court and was then replaced by an ARP filter design, the Model 4072.

== Models ==
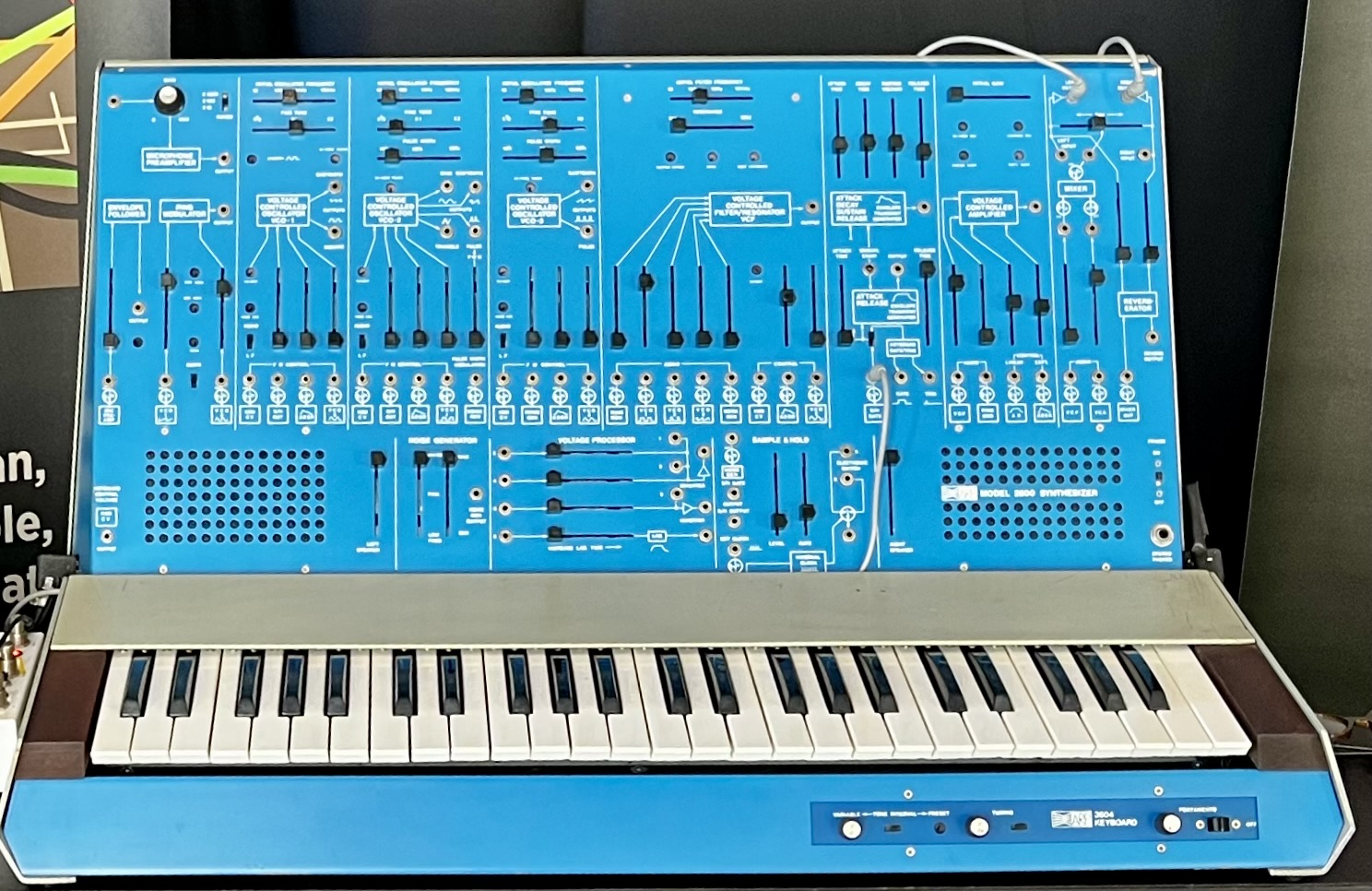
ARP 2600 Blue Meanie

Model 2600 "Blue Meanie" (early 1971): The earliest 2600s were assembled in a small facility on Kenneth Street in Newton Highlands, Massachusetts, during ARP's early stage. Housed in a bright blue and light gray aluminum case with a keyboard mated to the synthesizer, this version was nicknamed the "Blue Marvin" (after Marvin Cohen, ARP's CFO), but is now commonly referred to as the "Blue Meanie".

Model 2600C "Gray Meanie" (mid-1971): The 2600C was produced in the ARP factory and featured a gray control panel and updated keyboard model 3604C. Only 35 "Gray Meanies" were produced.

Model 2600P (late-1971): The 2600P was housed in a suitcase-style, vinyl-covered wood enclosure, making it a more portable instrument. V2.0 of the 2600P replaced ARP 4011/4017 VCO submodules with more reliable ARP 4027 submodules, and replaced unreliable Teledyne opamps with chips by National Semiconductor for a brief run in 1972, before being replaced by 2600P V3.0, which was produced until 1974 and used ARP 2037-1 VCO submodules and featured a new G-clef ARP logo. In 1974, 2600P V4.0 introduced the new Model 3620 duophonic keyboard with LFO.

Model 2601 (1975): 2601 V1.0 improved the jacks and slider controls of the previous model, but still included the disputed Model 4012 filter. In 1977, 2601 V2.0 introduced ARP's new Model 4072 filter, as well as the orange-over-black design theme of ARP's other synthesizers. One final version of the 2601, v3.0, was produced in ARP's final days.

== Impact ==
The first significant user of the 2600 was Edgar Winter, who connected the keyboard controller of the 2600 to the main unit via a long extension cord, allowing him to wear the synth around his neck. Stevie Wonder was another early adopter of the 2600; he had a unit labelled in Braille. Other early notable users included Pete Townshend, Joe Zawinul, and Herbie Hancock.

Tony Banks of Genesis used an ARP 2600 from A Trick of the Tail to ...And Then There Were Three.... He initially only used it in the studio because he feared its subtleties would be lost on stage, however he did eventually use it live on the ...And Then There Were Three... Tour in 1978.

Ozzy Osbourne purchased an ARP 2600 prior to the recording of the Black Sabbath album Sabbath Bloody Sabbath, where it is heard in the song "Who Are You?".

Sound designer Ben Burtt used an ARP 2600, combined with his own voice, to create the voice of R2-D2 in the Star Wars films. Burtt also used the 2600 to create the sound effects of the Ark of the Covenant in Raiders of the Lost Ark.

An ARP 2600 was used for several sounds on the 1983 Michael Jackson single "Thriller".

An ARP 2600 was used by Flood on "The Becoming" by Nine Inch Nails.

== Reissues and recreations ==
=== TTSH ===
Beginning in 2013, Swedish DIY synthesizer designer the Human Comparator has created multiple iterations of 3/4-scale PCB kits featuring circuitry and front-panel designs identical to the ARP 2600 (minus the keyboard). Dubbed the TTSH (Two Thousand Six Hundred), this project allows hobbyists to build their own synthesizer for a fraction of the price (US$499 for a panel and PCB set) of the original.

=== Korg ARP 2600 FS ===
On January 10, 2020, Korg Inc. of Japan reissued the ARP 2600 as the ARP 2600 FS, a faithful reproduction of the original 1972 gray version. The reissue adds features, including the ability to select between the 4012 and 4072 filter types found in the 1970s versions, balanced XLR outputs, MIDI, a basic sequencer/arpeggiator, and a flight case for travel. The keyboard included is based on the original 3620 keyboard, which now provides aftertouch.

=== Behringer 2600 ===
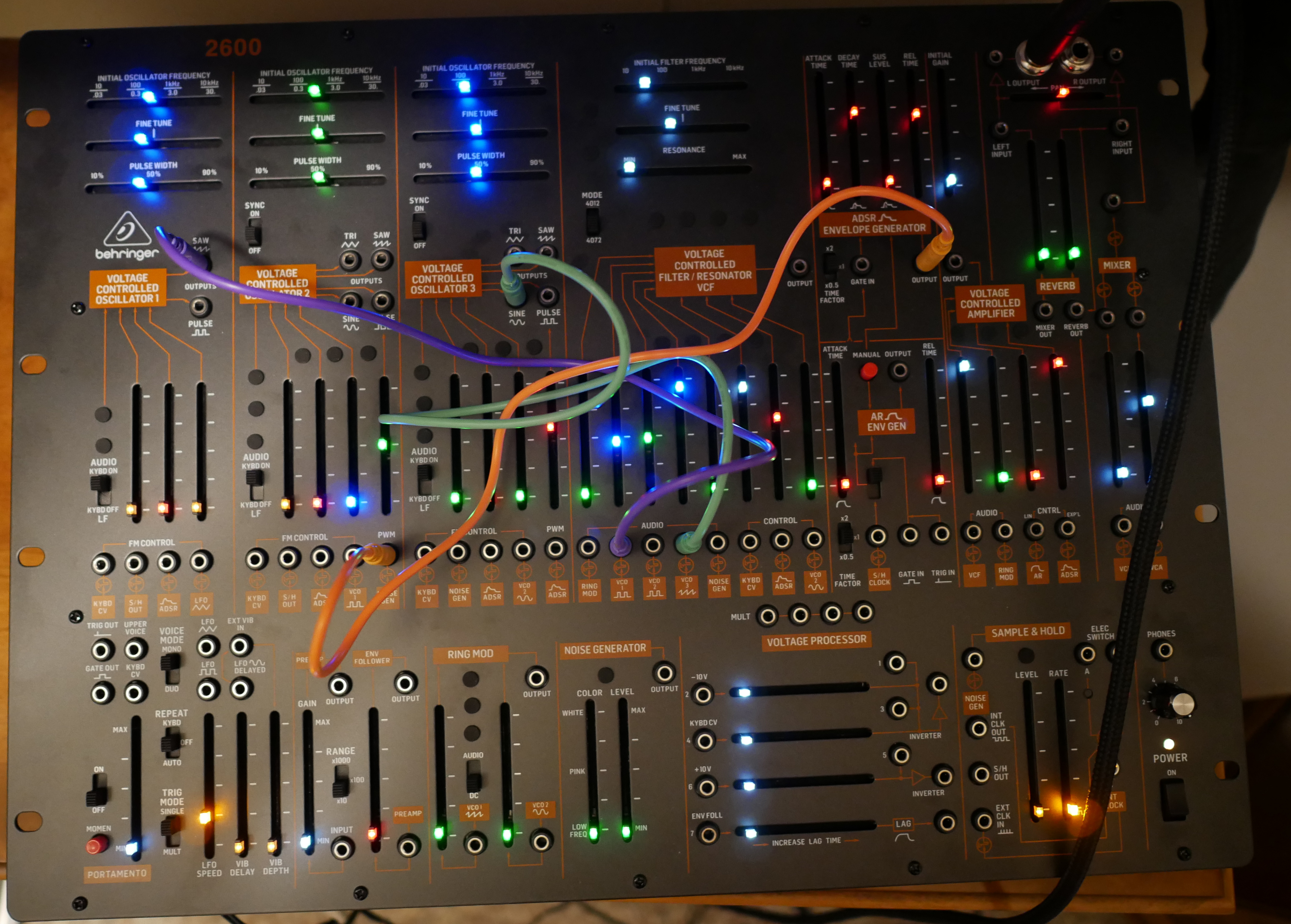
A Behringer 2600 clone

In 2020, Behringer released its own updated variant. In contrast to the original ARP or the versions produced by Korg, these features are different or new:

- 8U 19-inch rack chassis
- No speakers
- Digital spring reverb simulation instead of a physical spring tank (Behringer also makes "Blue Marvin" and "Gray Meanie" versions with a physical spring tank)
- LED faders
- VCO3 can put out a sine or triangle wave and has a PWM patch point
- VCO2 and 3 can sync to VCO1
- Both VCF versions are available, selected with a switch

=== Korg ARP 2600M ===
In 2022, Korg introduced a smaller version of the 2600 called the 2600M, which was identical to the FS, but 40% smaller.

=== Software emulations ===
Software companies, such as Arturia and Way Out Ware, have released software emulations for use with modern music equipment, such as MIDI devices and computer sequencers:

- Arturia ARP 2600 V
- TimewARP 2600
- Cherry Audio CA2600
- Air TIMEWARP 2600

On July 19th, 2024, Korg released a software version of the 2600.

== Gallery ==
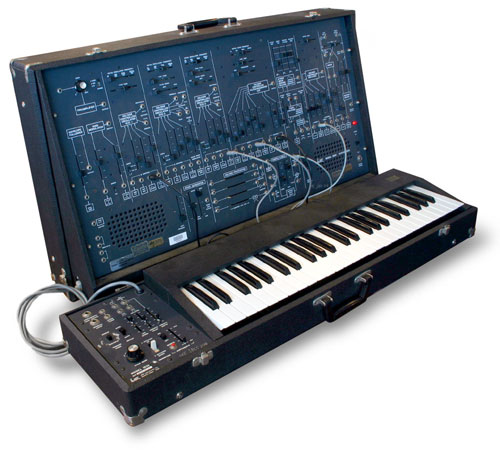
ARP 2600P V3.0 (1972–74) or V4.0 (1974) with
3620 duophonic keyboard (1974-?), new G-clef logo

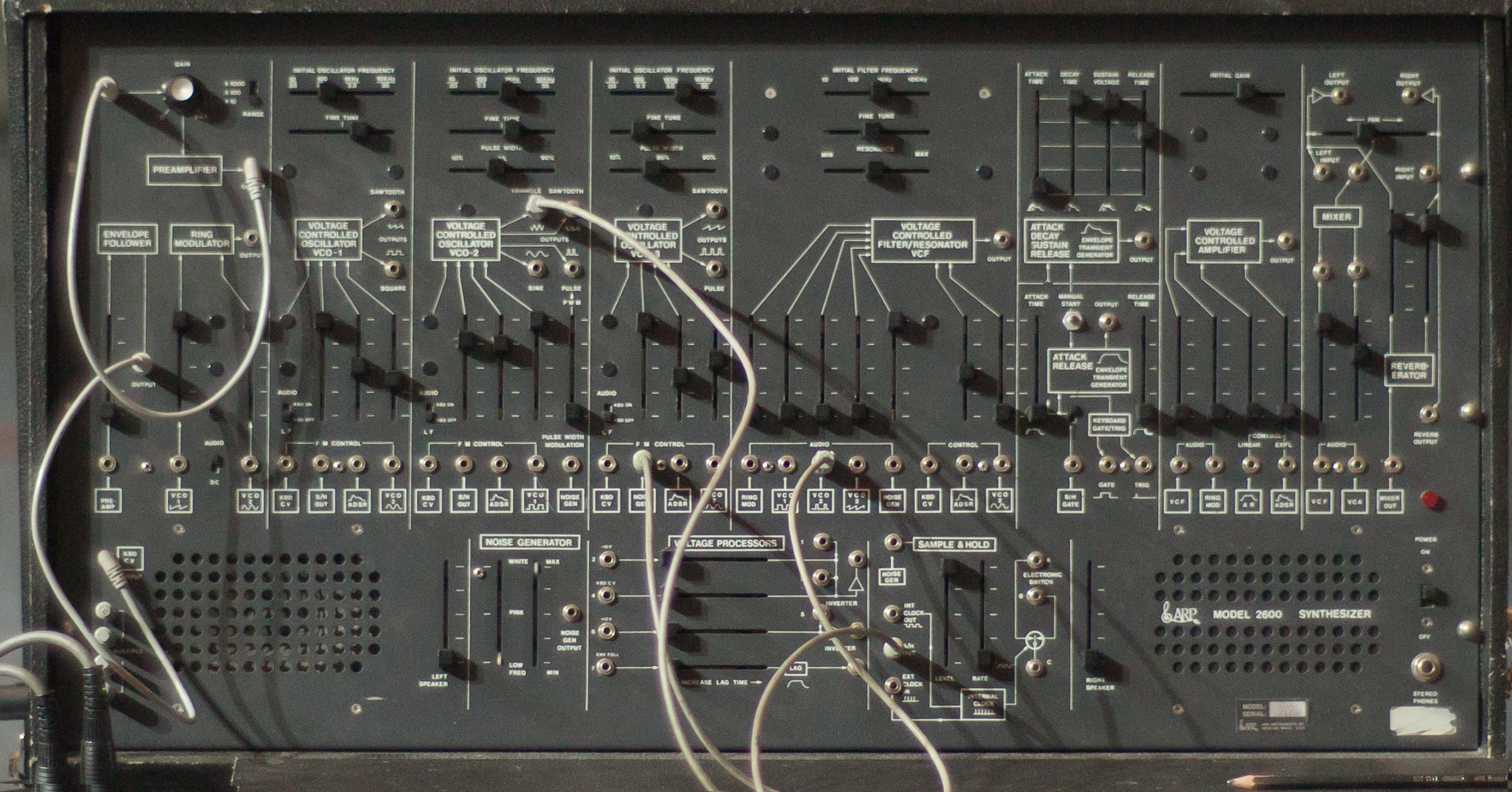
ARP 2600P V3.0 (1972–74) or V4.0 (1974) panel details

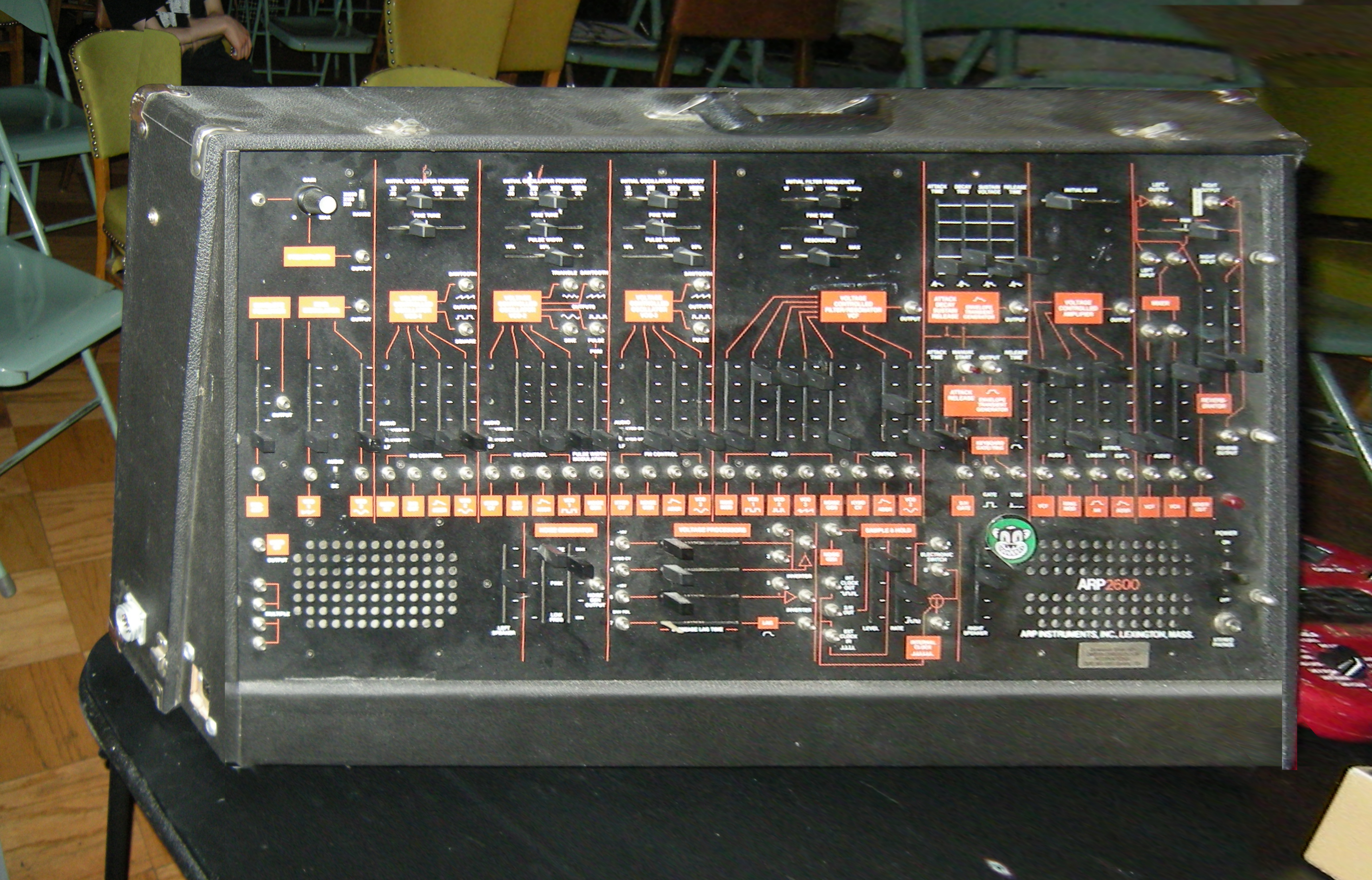
ARP 2601 V2.0 (1977–80) or V3.0 (1980, last 100 or so) black-on-orange model

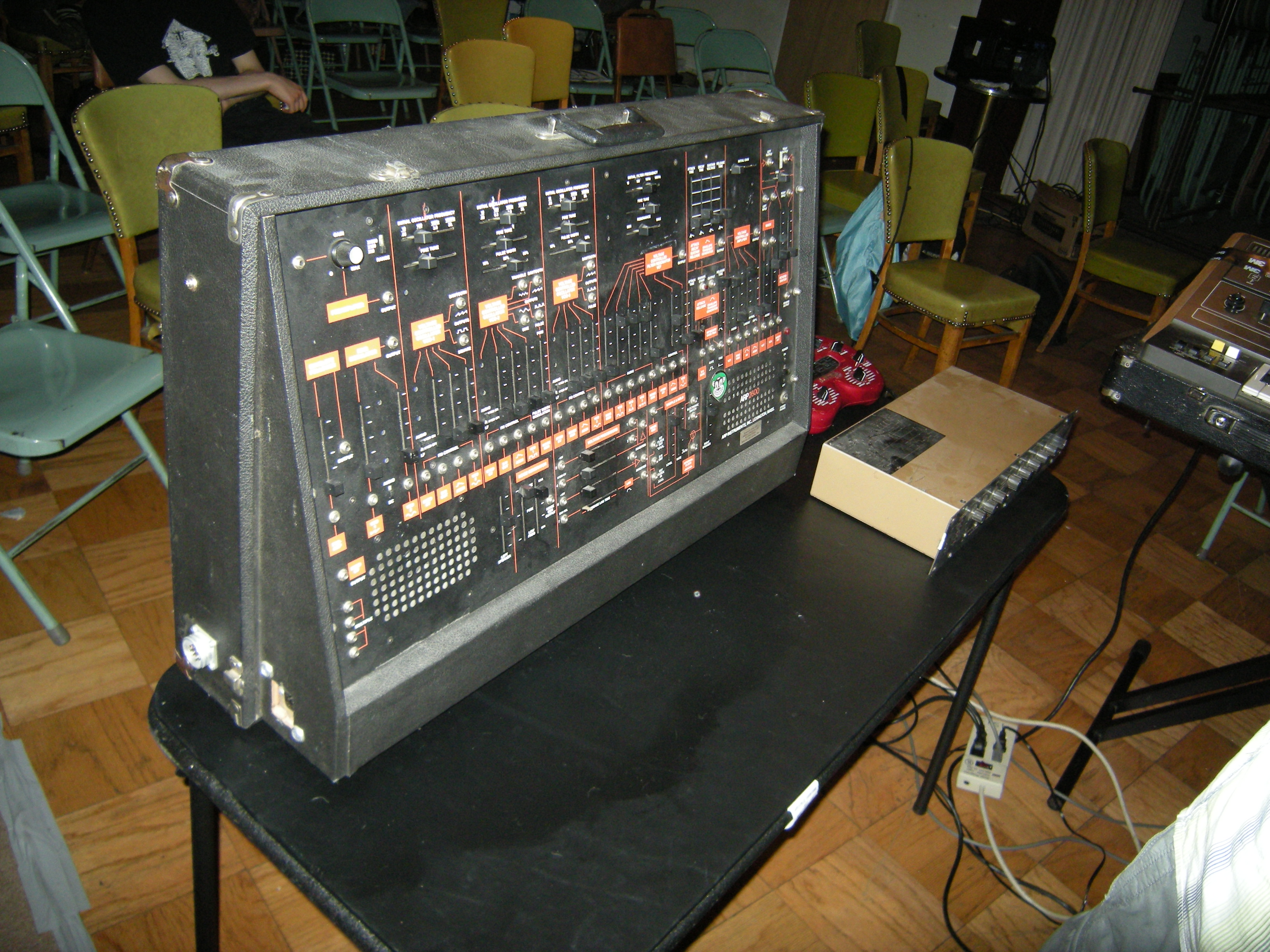
Steve Fisk's ARP 2600 (without keyboard)
