= Rhodes Chroma =

Analogue synthesizer

Rhodes Chroma with Expander
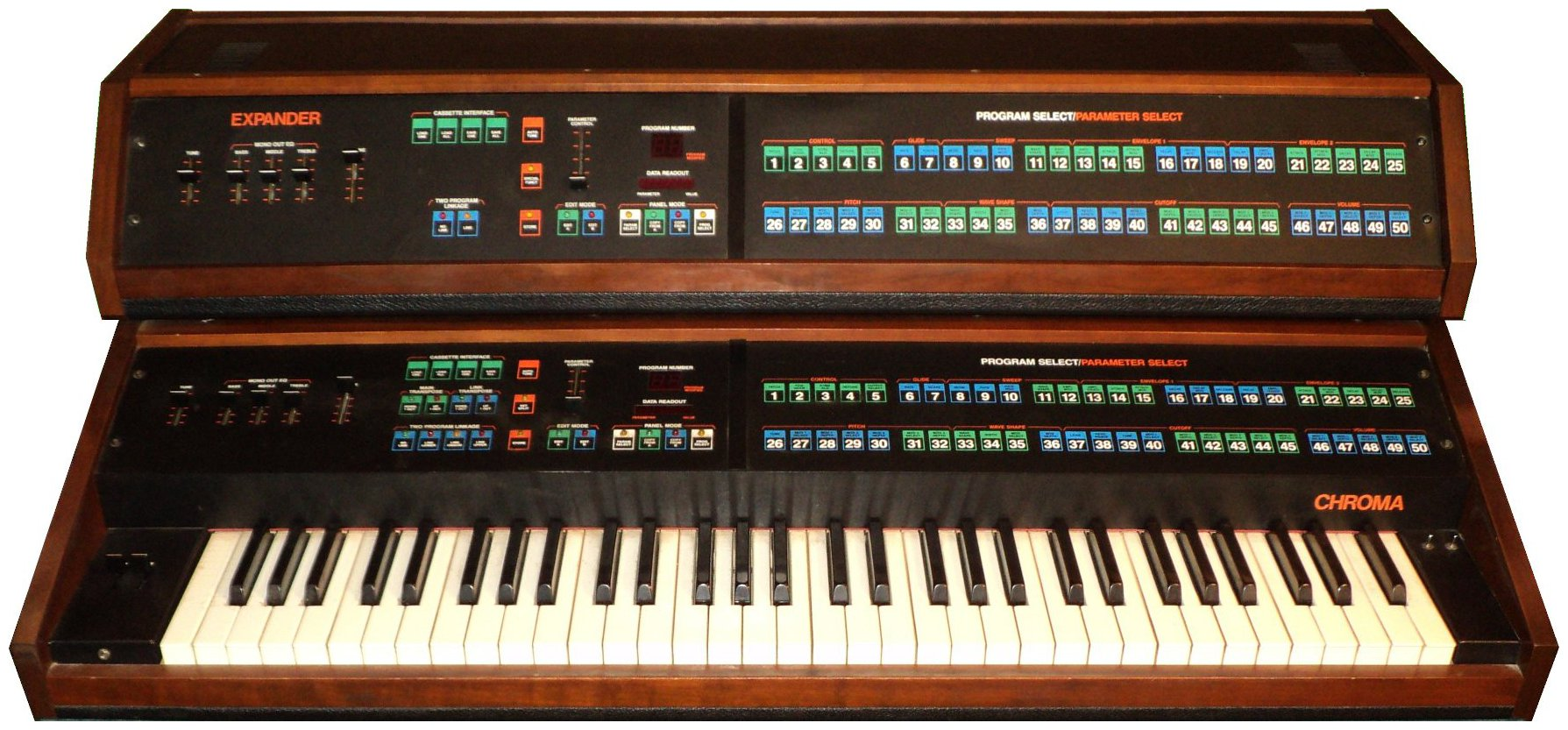
- Manufacturer: CBS Musical Instruments, Rhodes Division. Designed by ARP Instruments, Inc.
- Dates: 1982-1984
- Price: US$5295, Expander: US$3150

Technical specifications
- Polyphony: polyphonic 8 or 16
- Timbrality: multitimbral 2 (8 max under computer or MIDI control)
- Oscillator: 16 (1 or 2 per voice) VCO
- LFO: 16 (1 or 2 per voice) digitally generated - sine, cosine, offset sine, half sine, saw, square, lag square, 2 x triangles, random and 6 x patterns
- Synthesis type: Analog Subtractive
- Filter: VCF CEM3350, 1 or 2 per voice depending on voice mode. Each VCF can be 12db LP or 12 db HP in single 16 voice mode. In 8 voice mode filters can be combined to be 24db LP, HP or 12db BP or 12 db NP or dual 12db LP or dual 12db HP.
- Attenuator: 32 (2 or 4 per voice) digitally generated ADR envelopes, 16 with delay
- Aftertouch expression: Yes (optional - Polyphonic)
- Velocity expression: Yes
- Storage memory: 50 programs

Input/output
- Keyboard: 64 levered weighted keys, velocity sensitive, optional pressure sensitive
- Left-hand control: 2 levers with programmable function
- External control: Apple II interface or MIDI Retrofit Kit

The Rhodes Chroma, originally developed as the ARP Chroma, is a polyphonic, multitimbral, microprocessor-controlled analog synthesizer designed by ARP Instruments, Inc. in 1979–1980, shortly before the company's bankruptcy in 1981. The design was purchased by CBS Musical Instruments and put into production by its Rhodes Division in 1982 as the Rhodes Chroma at a list price of US$5295. Rhodes also released a keyboardless version of the Chroma called the Chroma Expander (US$3150).

The Chroma was one of the early microprocessor-controlled analog synthesizers. It was designed before MIDI and featured a 25-pin D-sub connector for computer communication and Expander linking. An Apple IIe interface card and sequencing software were also available.

Production ended in 1984 after an estimated 1400-3000 Chromas and Expanders were built.

== Design and architecture ==
The Chroma has a velocity-sensitive keyboard consisting of 64 weighted, levered wooden keys with optional polyphonic pressure-sensitivity. Few units included the original factory pressure sensor.

The Chroma's sixteen synthesizer channels consist of one voltage-controlled oscillator (VCO), waveshaper, filter, and amplifier under software control via multiplexed analog voltage control channels, grouped into eight A/B pairs.

Although the oscillators, filters and amplifiers themselves are voltage controlled, the overall control of the synthesizer channels is entirely in software. The embedded computer generates thirty-two ADSR envelopes (two per channel, one with delay) and sixteen LFO sweep signals in software. Signals from the controls are encoded digitally, processed by the computer, and sent to the synthesizer channels on the voice cards. Sound programs can use one channel per voice to produce sixteen-voice polyphony. Channels can be paired together for thicker, 8-voice sounds.

The Chroma uses an electronically reconfigurable system that allows its VCOs, VCFs and VCAs to be virtually patched in various configurations. Patch data and program parameters are stored digitally and can be saved or loaded from cassette.

Each sound program uses one of fifteen internal configurations linking the oscillators, filters, and amplifiers in different ways to create varied timbres, including series or parallel filter routing, oscillator sync, filter FM, and ring modulation.

== Hardware ==
The Chroma control panel consists of 71 membrane switches, most of which are multi-purpose for selecting sound programs or parameters, with a single slider for parameter values. Competing synthesizers such the Oberheim OB-8 used numerous of knobs and mechanical switches, but the Chroma's economical approach influenced later synthesizers like the Yamaha DX7. When a membrane switch is pressed, a "tapper" strikes the underside of the control panel to provide tactile feedback, an early example of haptic feedback technology.

The Chroma and Expander use a 68B09 microprocessor with a 25-pin D-sub connector. The original CPU board has 2 AA batteries to preserve memory while the power is off.

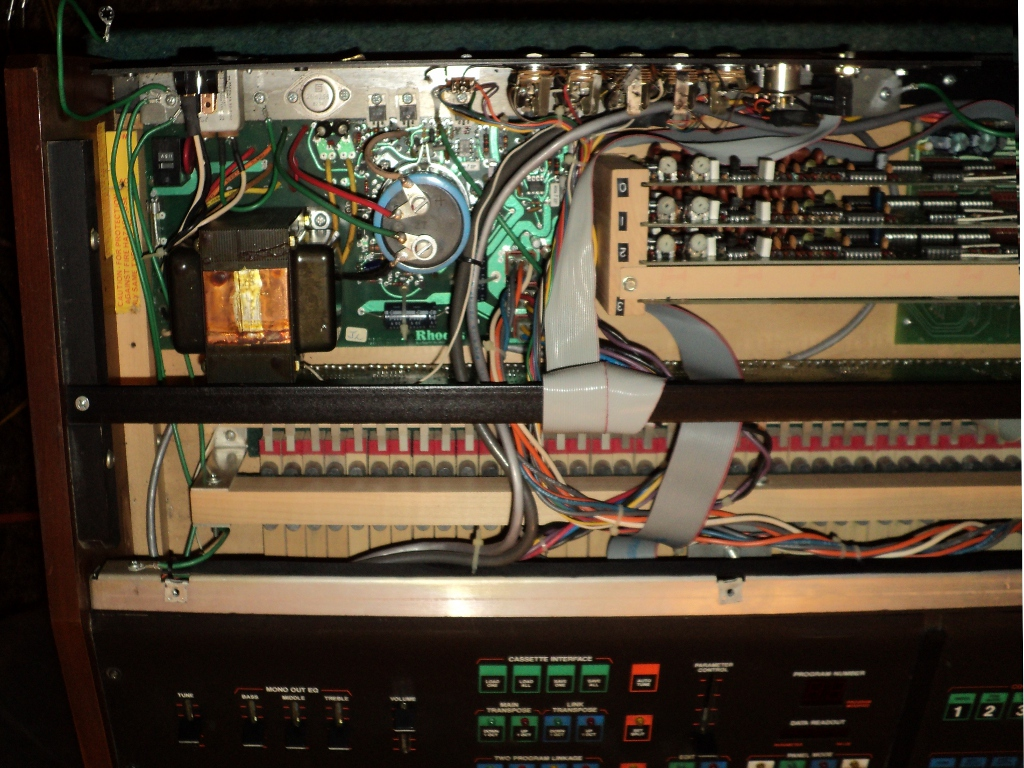

Third-party upgrades introduced in 2006 and 2008 included the CC+ CPU replacement board and a digital switching power supply kit, both improving reliability and adding optional MIDI support.

== Connectivity and accessories ==
The Chroma was designed and released before the introduction of MIDI. An Apple IIe interface card (used to connect to the Chroma's D-sub connector) and sequencing software was released by ARP and Fender Rhodes.

Accessories included a single footswitch dedicated to program changes and a programmable foot pedal, and a unique dual footswitch.

== Chroma expander ==
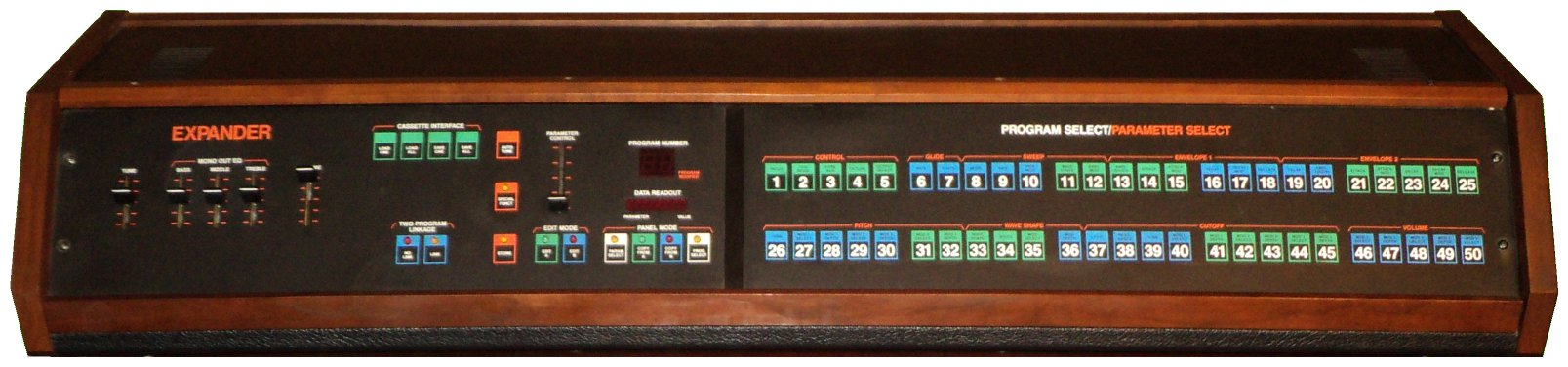
Chroma Expander

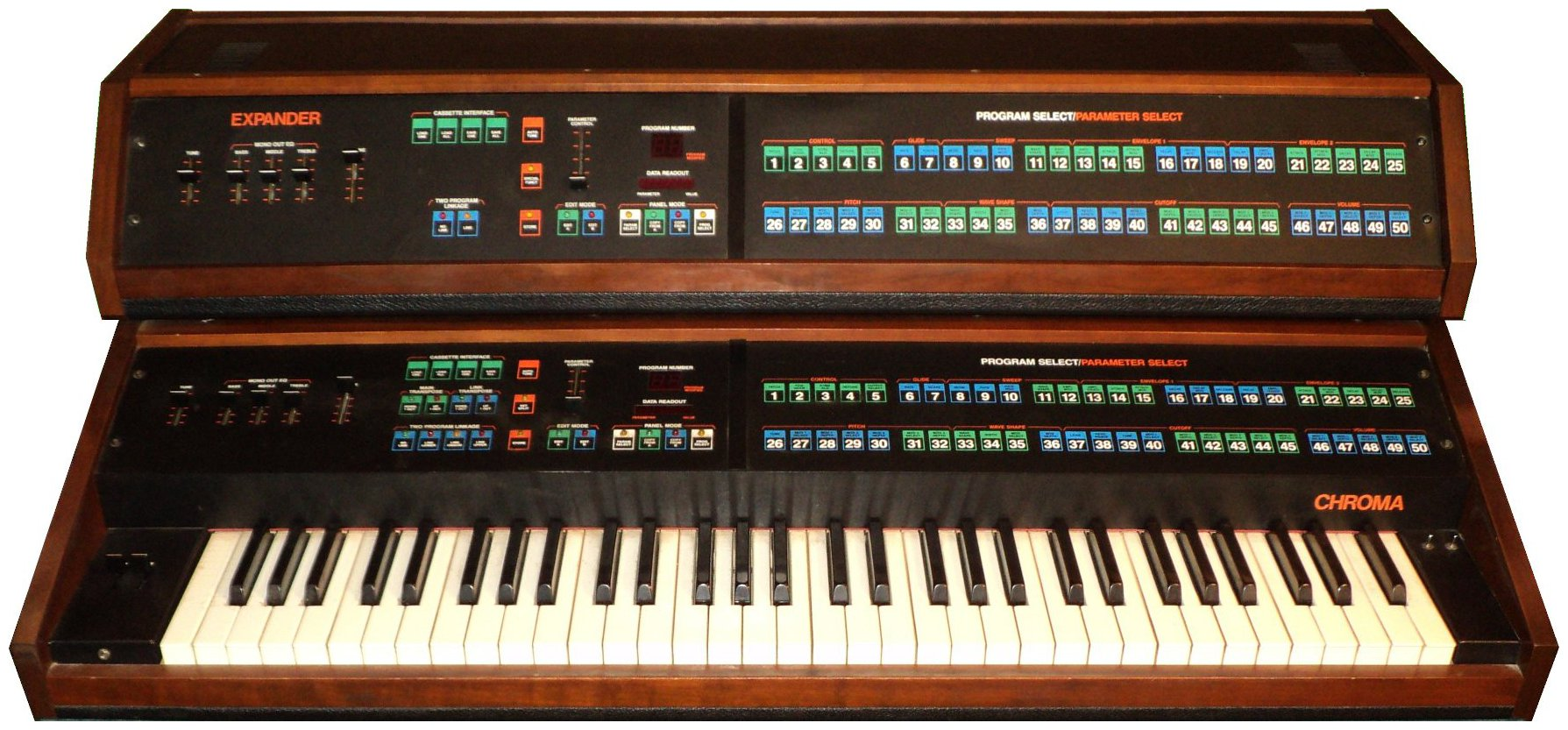
Rhodes Chroma with Expander

Fender also released a keyboard-less version of the Chroma called the Chroma Expander. Like the Chroma, the main microprocessor in the Expander is a 68B09 with a computer interface consisting of a 25-pin D-sub connector. The Expander can be slaved to the Chroma via the 25-pin D-sub connector. Third party Chroma-to-MIDI converter boxes produced for the Chroma also work for the Expander.
