= ARP Avatar =

Guitar synthesizer

Avatar
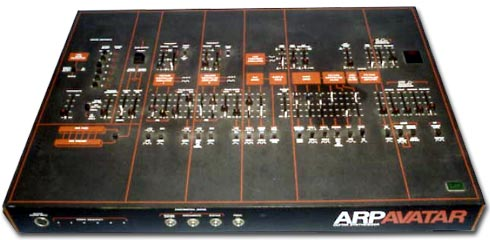
- ARP Avatar
- Manufacturer: ARP Instruments, Inc.
- Dates: 1977
- Price: US $3000

Technical specifications
- Polyphony: Monophonic
- Timbrality: Monotimbral
- Oscillator: 2
- LFO: Sine, Square
- Synthesis type: Analog Subtractive
- Attenuator: ADSR, AR
- Storage memory: none
- Effects: 1

Input/output
- Keyboard: none
- External control: CV/Gate

The ARP Avatar was a guitar synthesizer manufactured by ARP Instruments beginning in 1977. While innovative, being one of the first commercial guitar-controlled synthesizers, it was a commercial failure, and is widely blamed for the financial collapse of ARP Instruments.

== History ==
ARP Instruments began developing the Avatar in 1977, hoping to tap into the guitar player market, which was four times larger than the keyboard player market at the time. The Avatar was a synthesizer module virtually identical to the ARP Odyssey without a keyboard with an added 6-way "fuzzbox" distortion effect, intended to be played by a solid body electric guitar via a specially-mounted hexaphonic guitar pickup whose signals were then processed through discrete pitch-to-voltage converters.

Although groundbreaking as one of the first commercial guitar-controlled synthesizers, ARP spent $4 million on Avatar's research and development and initial production, and sales of the guitar synthesizer over the two years it was on the market totaled only $1 million. Guitarists were not quick to adopt the new technology, mostly due to the unit's price and technical eccentricities. After failing to recoup the Avatar's losses, ARP Instruments declared bankruptcy in May 1981.

An early Avatar was delivered to Pete Townshend in the summer of 1977. Other notable Avatar users include Mike Rutherford, Steve Howe, Paddy Kingsland of the BBC Radiophonic Workshop, Howard Leese, and Jimmy Page.

Due to the Avatar's similarities with the synthesis architecture of the Odyssey, it has regained a little stature among collectors as a standalone synthesizer.
