= Living Torch =

Studio album by Kali Malone
- Released: July 7, 2022
- Recorded: 2020–2021
- Studios: INA GRM; EMS
- Genre: Electroacoustic
- Length: 33:33
- Label: Portraits GRM
- Producer: Kali Malone

Kali Malone chronology
The Sacrificial Code (2019)	Living Torch (2022)	Does Spring Hide Its Joy (2023)

Living Torch is a studio album by American composer Kali Malone. It was released on July 7, 2022, through Portraits GRM. It received universal acclaim from critics.

== Background ==
Kali Malone is an American composer born in Colorado and based in Stockholm, Sweden. Living Torch is her first studio album since The Sacrificial Code (2019). It was commissioned by the Groupe de Recherches Musicales (GRM).

Living Torch consists of two tracks: "Living Torch I" and "Living Torch II". It was composed at GRM studios in Paris, France, between 2020 and 2021. Malone wrote the album in 11-odd limit just intonation. She used Éliane Radigue's ARP 2500 synthesizer, as well as boîte à bourdons. The album features contributions from Mats Äleklint (on trombone) and Isak Hedtjärn (on bass clarinet).

Living Torch was conceived for GRM's Acousmonium speaker setup and premiered there in October 2021, three months after the death of Peter Rehberg, who launched Recollection GRM and Portraits GRM. The album was released on July 7, 2022, through Portraits GRM.

== Critical reception ==
Professional ratings
Aggregate scores
Source	Rating
Metacritic	84/100
Review scores
Source	Rating
Pitchfork	8.0/10
Uncut	8/10

According to the review aggregator Metacritic, Living Torch received "universal acclaim" based on a weighted average score of 84 out of 100 from 4 critic scores.

Jaša Bužinel of The Quietus stated, "Taking from the heritage of American minimalism and the French 20th century avant-garde, despite its monolithic soundwaves (like the most powerful sun rays piercing your body at noon at the height of summer) and apparently static nature, Living Torch is Malone's most dynamic and eventful work so far." Ted Davis of Resident Advisor wrote, "Where her past work could sound like it was written for a grandiose 18th-century opera house, Living Torch is closer to the long-lost sonic component of a modern art installation, endless in its possibilities and imagination."

Los Angeles Times placed "Living Torch I" at number 47 on its list of "The 100 Best Songs of 2022".

=== Accolades ===
Year-end lists for Living Torch
Publication	List	Rank	Ref.
The Quietus	Quietus Albums of the Year 2022	34	
The Vinyl Factory	Our Favourite Albums of 2022	—	
The Wire	Releases of the Year (2022 Rewind)	5	

== Track listing ==
All tracks are written by Kali Malone.

Living Torch track listing
No.	Title	Length
1.	"Living Torch I"	18:33
2.	"Living Torch II"	15:00
Total length:		33:33

== Personnel ==
Credits adapted from liner notes.

- Kali Malone – ARP 2500, modular synthesis, pure data, boîte à bourdons, production
- Mats Äleklint – trombone
- Isak Hedtjärn – bass clarinet
- Emmanuel Richier – pre-mastering
- Stephan Mathieu – mastering
- Andreas Kauffelt – lacquer cut
- Stephen O'Malley – sleeve design
- Estelle Hanania – photography
- Ross Caliendo – painting
