= The Sacrificial Code =

Studio album by Kali Malone
- Released: June 28, 2019
- Studios: Kungliga Musikhögskolan; Acusticum; Hagakyrka
- Genre: Experimental
- Length: 106:07
- Label: iDEAL

Kali Malone chronology
Cast of Mind (2018)	The Sacrificial Code (2019)	Living Torch (2022)

The Sacrificial Code is a studio album by American composer Kali Malone. It was released on June 28, 2019, through iDEAL Recordings. It received generally favorable reviews from critics.

== Background ==
Kali Malone is an American composer born in Colorado and based in Stockholm, Sweden. The Sacrificial Code is her first solo album since Cast of Mind (2018). She created the album while finishing a master's thesis in electroacoustic composition at the Royal College of Music, Stockholm. It includes additional organ work from Ellen Arkbro. It was released on June 28, 2019, through iDEAL Recordings.

The reissue edition was released on April 11, 2025, through Ideologic Organ. It includes a new arrangement of the title track recorded in 2023 on a 16th-century organ at Malmö Konstmuseum.

== Critical reception ==
Professional ratings
Aggregate scores
Source	Rating
Metacritic	80/100
Review scores
Source	Rating
Pitchfork	8.6/10
Resident Advisor	3.9/5
Spectrum Culture	85%
Tiny Mix Tapes	4/5 stars

According to the review aggregator Metacritic, The Sacrificial Code received "generally favorable reviews" based on a weighted average score of 80 out of 100 from 4 critic scores.

Lewis Gordon of Resident Advisor wrote, "Its uniformity, as well as the intense slowness to Malone's performance, help make the tracks feel as if they're merging into one another, prompting a strange, temporal disorientation." He added, "Like some of the most affecting drone music, The Sacrificial Code is imbued with almost magical, time-stretching properties. " Philip Sherburne of Pitchfork stated, "In its bracing purity and focused intent, it remains a high-water mark in her catalog."

=== Accolades ===
Year-end lists for The Sacrificial Code
Publication	List	Rank	Ref.
Fact	The Best Albums of 2019	—	
Pitchfork	The Best Experimental Albums of 2019	—	
The Wire	Releases of the Year (2019 Rewind)	7	

== Track listing ==
All tracks are written by Kali Malone.

The Sacrificial Code track listing
No.	Title	Length
1.	"Spectacle of Ritual"	10:53
2.	"Sacrificial Code"	5:29
3.	"Rose Wreath Crown" (for CW)	10:26
4.	"Sacer Profanare"	8:48
5.	"Litanic Cloth Wrung"	13:25
6.	"Fifth Worship II"	7:50
7.	"Hagakyrka Bells"	1:08
8.	"Prelude" (live in Hagakyrka)	11:23
9.	"Sacrificial Code" (live in Hagakyrka)	13:22
10.	"Glory Canon III" (live in Hagakyrka)	23:23
Total length:		106:07

2025 reissue edition track listing
No.	Title	Length
1.	"Spectacle of Ritual"	10:53
2.	"Sacrificial Code"	5:29
3.	"Rose Wreath Crown" (for CW)	10:26
4.	"Sacer Profanare"	8:48
5.	"Litanic Cloth Wrung"	13:25
6.	"Fifth Worship II"	7:50
7.	"Hagakyrka Bells"	1:08
8.	"Sacrificial Code II"	13:22
9.	"Sacrificial Code III"	4:08
Total length:		75:29

== Personnel ==
Credits adapted from the 2019 original edition's liner notes.

- Kali Malone – performance, recording
- Karl Sjölund – recording assistance (4–6)
- Ellen Arkbro – performance (7–10)
- Rasmus Persson – recording (7–10)
- Rashad Becker – mastering
- A.M. Rehm – photography
