= Ellen Arkbro =

Swedish composer

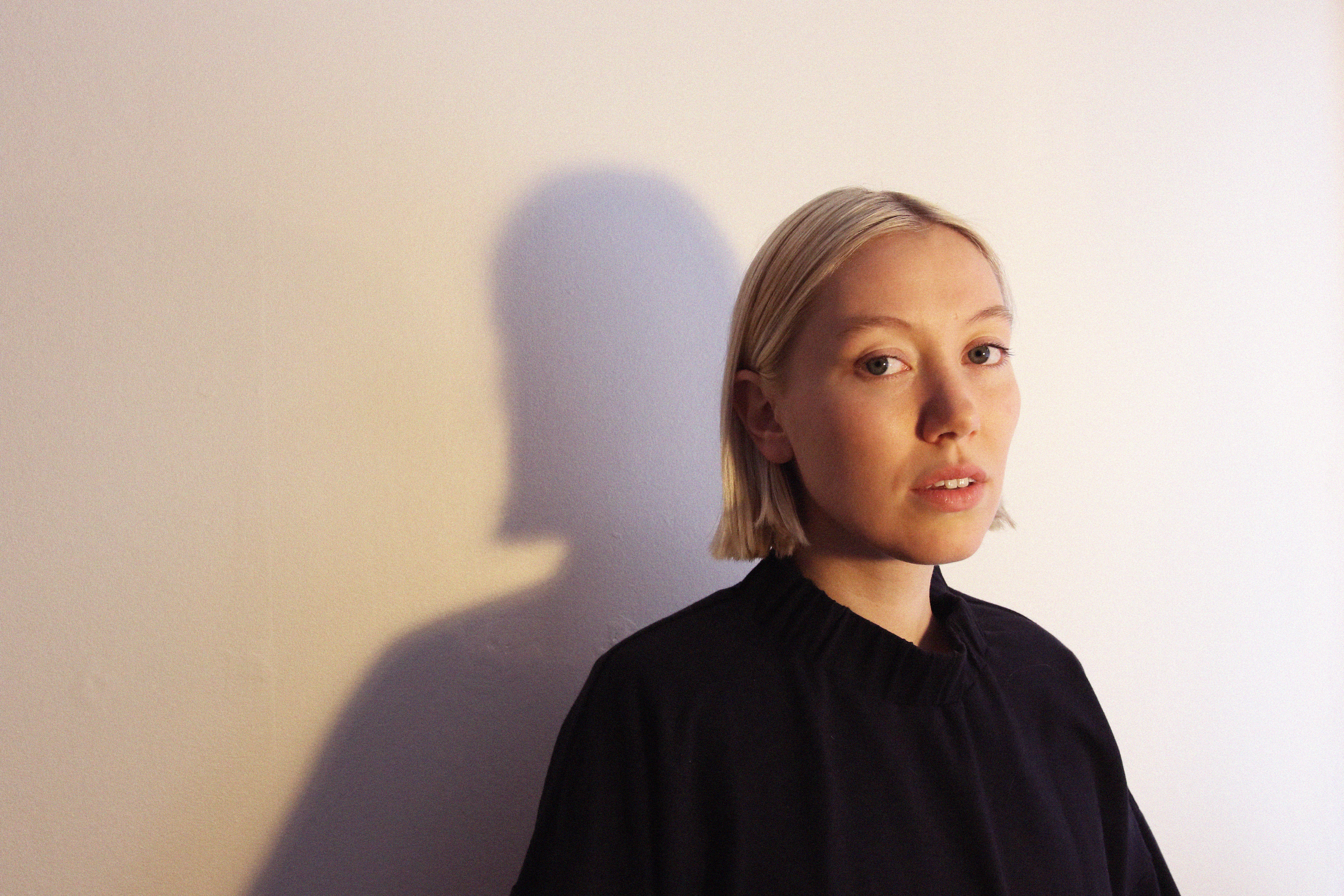
- Arkbro in 2016

Background information
- Born: 1990 (age 35–36); Stockholm, Sweden
- Genres: Minimalism, microtonal music, drone
- Instruments: Pipe organ; Voice
- Website: ellenarkbro.com

Ellen Arkbro (born 1990) is a Swedish composer, sound artist and musician working with precision-tuned harmony in frameworks such as just intonation and meantone temperament. Having primarily composed for and performed on pipe organ, Arkbro's work has also included pieces for other acoustic instruments and sound synthesis. She has released several studio albums, beginning with For Organ and Brass (2017), in additional to several collaborative works.

== Early life ==
Arkbro was born in Stockholm and grew up singing in choir school, playing in bands, and eventually studying jazz as a singer. As a 20 year old, Arkbro went on to study at Elektronmusikstudion, and later received a degree in composition of electronic music from the Royal College of Music in Stockholm. As part of earning that degree, Arkbro spent time in Berlin studying composition with Marc Sabat in Berlin, studies which focused on the theory and practice of tuning. In 2014, Arkbro studied privately with La Monte Young and Marian Zazeela in New York.

== Recordings ==
=== For Organ and Brass ===
For her 2017 debut album For Organ and Brass, Arkbro uses the Sherer-Orgel organ at St. Stephen's Church in Tangermünde, Germany, an instrument dating to 1624, in a church dating to 1118. The LP comprises recordings of her compositions in just intonation for renaissance organ, horn, trombone and microtonal tuba.

The [title] piece came about while I was spending time with the meantone temperament of the organ in the German Church in Stockholm. I soon came to realise that I could use this traditional renaissance tuning in a non-traditional way that would allow me to compose music solely with septimal intervals. These are sounds that I have to come to love for their unique character. There is a textural aspect of these intervals which makes them stand out from the rest. And then there is the equally important affective aspect: a kind of open, clear sadness [which are] some of the reasons to why I’ve ended up working with them.

=== CHORDS ===
CHORDS (2019) was designed to draw attention to the way sound exists in space, the way tonality and harmony affect an environment. The music is intended for large speakers, allowing it to take over a home and envelop the listener.

Pitchfork finds that the album "delves even deeper into microtonal interplay, balancing heady theoretical terrain with a rare emotional resonance. [Arkbro's] music is infused with a profound emotionality that transcends its heady origins. Passing through the gates of extreme rigor, CHORDS finds private infinity in a handful or stretched-out drones."

=== Sounds while waiting ===
Sounds while waiting (2021) is an album that explores the long drawn out manner of playing chords in a resonant space. It focuses on exploring the depths of a "rough, focused and yet strangely transparent" form of "texturality". The instrumentation consists of organ and cymbals and the album contains the two-parter "Sculpture", along with 2 others.

=== I get along without you very well ===
I get along without you very well (2022), a collaboration with Swedish multi-instrumentalist Johan Graden, is an LP of songs that introduces Arkbro as a vocalist. The instrumentation is percussion, clarinet, organ, and brass. Each piece is, in its way, meandering, improvisatory, and drawn-out to an extreme, "wistfully throwing up a handful of ideas and letting them float in the breeze, employing the faintest of structures to lure them back to earth."

== Discography ==
=== Solo ===
- For Organ and Brass (2017, Subtext Recordings)
- CHORDS (2019, Subtext Recordings)
- Sounds while waiting (2021, self-released)
- Sounds while waiting (2023, Superior Viaduct)
- Nightclouds (2025, Blank Forms)

=== Collaboration ===
- Golden Offence Orchestra – Ode to Pauline Oliveros (2013, XKatedral)
- Hästköttskandalen – Spacegirls (2015, Fylkingen Records)
- Ellen Arkbro, Caterina Barbieri, Kali Malone – XKatedral Volume III (2016, XKatedral)
- Ellen Arkbro & Johan Graden – I get along without you very well (2022, Thrill Jockey)
- Ellen Arkbro & Hanne Lippard & Hampus Lindwall – How Do I Know If My Cat Likes Me? (2025, Blank Forms, La Becque Editions)
