= Does Spring Hide Its Joy =

Studio album by Kali Malone featuring Stephen O'Malley and Lucy Railton
- Released: January 20, 2023
- Recorded: May 2020
- Studios: MONOM (Berlin, Germany); Funkhaus Berlin (Berlin, Germany)
- Genre: Drone
- Length: 303:01
- Label: Ideologic Organ

Kali Malone chronology
Living Torch (2022)	Does Spring Hide Its Joy (2023)	All Life Long (2024)

Does Spring Hide Its Joy is a 2023 album by American composer Kali Malone featuring guitarist Stephen O'Malley and cellist Lucy Railton, released on January 20, 2023, through Ideologic Organ, a label owned by O'Malley. It is composed of three hour-long variations on the same piece. The album received acclaim from critics.

== Background ==
Malone composed the album on sine wave oscillators with her husband, guitarist Stephen O'Malley, cellist Lucy Railton and a "skeleton crew of technicians" in May 2020 at MONOM and Funkhaus Berlin in Berlin.

== Critical reception ==
Professional ratings
Aggregate scores
Source	Rating
Metacritic	82/100
Review scores
Source	Rating
Exclaim!	8/10
The Irish Times	5/5 stars
Loud and Quiet	5/10
Mojo	4/5 stars
Pitchfork	8.0/10
The Skinny	3/5 stars
Spectrum Culture	75%
Uncut	8/10

According to the review aggregator Metacritic, Does Spring Hide Its Joy received "universal acclaim" based on a weighted average score of 82 out of 100 from 8 critic scores.

Jonathan Williger of Pitchfork wrote that "each performance is different, allowing for an ever-shifting relationship to the material and its genesis" as they are "anchored by a shared tonic drone" so "easily melt into one sprawling three-hour epic". The Wire felt that "such durational pieces, composed from several instruments, recall Phill Niblock, but Malone's album is softer, more atmospheric, even melancholic. Does Spring Hide Its Joy is material for deep listening, and its considerable length alone is a radical statement in times of fragmented attention".

Mojo stated that "this is music that needs to be heard in as long a form as possible, so nothing breaks the immersive hallucinatory effect, and you can lose all sense of time, direction and place". Uncut opined that "the music spreads, and the sound engrosses and uplifts you, the tacit message feels humble and lightly worn: one of consideration, empathy and collective strength". Exclaim!'s Chris Bryson felt that O'Malley's "electric guitar's saturation, overtones and distortion provide fullness to Malone and cellist Lucy Railton's mutating circuitry", calling the album "a beacon of possibility". Conor McTernan of Resident Advisor noted that the album "stretches out like the bleakest patches of winter before blossoming into light airy spring" as "Malone recycles motifs with a range of raw and compelling tones".

Joe Creely of The Skinny remarked that "there are long stretches, particularly during the muted take on V1 in which the pieces are impressive rather than affecting, where you can marvel at Malone's skill with timbre without being moved in any way". Reviewing the album for The Quietus, Antonio Poscic found the album to be "a monumental, texturally and harmonically rich drone that moves in waves, maintaining a dynamic presence despite its languid pace". He also found that "while Malone's compositional touch is what ultimately dictates the shape and flow of the pieces, Railton and O'Malley's contributions are just as important in building their mesmerising fabric".

=== Accolades ===
Year-end lists for Does Spring Hide Its Joy
Publication	List	Rank	Ref.
Stereogum	The 10 Best Experimental Albums of 2023	1	

== Track listing ==
The vinyl version includes three LPs, with v1 on three sides and v2 on the other three sides. The CD version includes v1, v2 and v3 on three separate discs. The digital version separates v1 and v2 into three movements each, and then adds the full versions of v1, v2 and v3 all for a total of nine tracks.

Does Spring Hide Its Joy digital track listing
No.	Title	Length
1.	"Does Spring Hide Its Joy v1.1"	21:04
2.	"Does Spring Hide Its Joy v1.2"	18:50
3.	"Does Spring Hide Its Joy v1.3"	20:30
4.	"Does Spring Hide Its Joy v2.1"	20:12
5.	"Does Spring Hide Its Joy v2.2"	18:08
6.	"Does Spring Hide Its Joy v2.3"	22:43
7.	"Does Spring Hide Its Joy v1"	60:25
8.	"Does Spring Hide Its Joy v2"	60:54
9.	"Does Spring Hide Its Joy v3"	60:15
Total length:		303:01

== Personnel ==
- Kali Malone – composer, synthesizer
- Stephen O'Malley – electric guitar, album design
- Lucy Railton – cello
- Rodrigo Stambuck – recording (v1)
- Jonny Zoum – recording (v2 and v3)
- Tristan Mazire – mixing (at Studio Garage, Paris)
- François-Xavier Delaby – mixing (at Studio Garage, Paris)
- Stephan Mathieu – music edit and mastering (at Schwebung Mastering)
- Nika Milano – artwork

== Charts ==
Chart performance for Does Spring Hide Its Joy
Chart (2023)	Peak position
UK Album Downloads (Official Charts)	18
UK Independent Albums (Official Charts)	26
