= The Torrid Eye =

EP by Acronym and Kali Malone
- Released: January 23, 2019
- Recorded: 2015–2017
- Studios: Royal College of Music, Stockholm; Stilla Ton
- Genres: Experimental; ambient techno
- Length: 28:14
- Label: Stilla Ton

Acronym and Kali Malone chronology
Vaagner Event Series - Berlin (2018)	The Torrid Eye (2019)

The Torrid Eye is a collaborative EP by Swedish musician Acronym and American musician Kali Malone. It was released on January 23, 2019, through Stilla Ton.

== Background ==
Dan Vincente, better known under the pseudonym Acronym, is a Swedish record producer from Stockholm. Kali Malone is an American composer from Denver, Colorado, and based in Stockholm. They previously collaborated on one of Vaagner's Event Series cassettes. The Torrid Eye is their first collaborative studio release. The EP consists of five tracks: "Call from the Tower", "A Sunspot", "Tempest of Joy", "Legs of the Fly", and "Tarmar". It was recorded using a Buchla 200 modular synthesizer and some other analog equipment. The EP's closing track "Tarmar" features Marianna Feher reading texts by Karl Sjölund.

The EP was released on January 23, 2019, through Stilla Ton.

== Critical reception ==
Professional ratings
Review scores
Source	Rating
Resident Advisor	3.8/5
Tiny Mix Tapes	4/5 stars
XLR8R	7.5/10

Thea Ballard of Pitchfork stated, "While both artists tend more towards drone pacing, the surprise on this concise EP is how it slowly blossoms into a proper, if heady, techno outing." Cookcook of Tiny Mix Tapes commented that they "present circuits of thought and feeling frequently heard in drone music, ambient, electronica, and downtempo techno." She added, "Rather than trying to mash these palettes into some newly prescribed form, they focus on building accumulative dialogues among crafted structures of synthesis."

=== Accolades ===
Year-end lists for The Torrid Eye
Publication	List	Rank	Ref.
Pitchfork	The Best Experimental Albums of 2019	—	

== Track listing ==
The Torrid Eye track listing
No.	Title	Length
1.	"Call from the Tower"	3:21
2.	"A Sunspot"	5:52
3.	"Tempest of Joy"	5:20
4.	"Legs of the Fly"	6:18
5.	"Tarmar"	7:23
Total length:		28:14

== Personnel ==
Credits adapted from liner notes.

- Acronym
- Kali Malone
- Karl Sjölund – words (on "Tarmar")
- Marianna Feher – vocals (on "Tarmar")
- Giuseppe Tilliecci – mastering
- Victoria Loeb – photography
