= Blue Veil (album) =

Studio album by Lucy Railton
- Released: 18 April 2025
- Recorded: June 2024
- Studio: Église du Saint-Esprit, Paris
- Genre: Experimental
- Length: 40:01
- Label: Ideologic Organ
- Producer: Kali Malone; Stephen O'Malley

Lucy Railton chronology
Corner Dancer (2023)	Blue Veil (2025)

Blue Veil is a solo studio album by British cellist, composer, and curator Lucy Railton. It was released on 18 April 2025 through Ideologic Organ. It received universal acclaim from critics.

== Background ==
Lucy Railton is a British cellist, composer, and curator. Blue Veil is her first record of solo cello compositions. It consists of seven tracks, clocking in at 40 minutes. It was recorded at Église du Saint-Esprit, Paris. Kali Malone and Stephen O'Malley produced the album. The album was released on 18 April 2025 through Ideologic Organ.

== Critical reception ==
Professional ratings
Aggregate scores
Source	Rating
Metacritic	83/100
Review scores
Source	Rating
AllMusic	4/5 stars
Pitchfork	7.7/10
Uncut	8/10

According to the review aggregator Metacritic, Blue Veil received "universal acclaim" based on a weighted average score of 83 out of 100 from 4 critic scores.

Levi Dayan of The Quietus commented that "Blue Veil immerses listeners in a sound world driven entirely by dense, textural acoustic overtones." He added, "Blue Veil reflects Railton's interest in making open and engaging music that does not get lost in the trappings of academic experimental music." Daniel Bromfield of Pitchfork wrote, "There are times when the timbre of the cello sounds hyperreal, almost like a computer preset; Railton displays little dynamic range as she patiently, almost surgically traces the edges of cool minor chords and discordant clusters." James Manheim of AllMusic stated, "Listeners interested in microtones and their possibilities in a close-up focused environment are advised to hear Blue Veil."

=== Accolades ===
Year-end lists for Blue Veil
Publication	List	Rank	Ref.
Stereogum	The 10 Best Experimental Albums of 2025	4	
The Wire	Releases of the Year (2025 Rewind)	32	

== Track listing ==
All tracks are written by Lucy Railton.

Blue Veil track listing
No.	Title	Length
1.	"Phase I"	4:19
2.	"Phase II"	4:32
3.	"Phase III"	8:58
4.	"Phase IV"	5:15
5.	"Phase V"	2:54
6.	"Phase VI"	4:51
7.	"Phase VII"	9:11
Total length:		40:01

== Personnel ==
Credits adapted from liner notes.

- Lucy Railton – performance
- Kali Malone – production, recording
- Stephen O'Malley – production, recording
- Joshua Sabin – pre-mix editing
- Marta Salogni – mixing
- Rashad Becker – mastering
- Jose M Spínola – cover photography
- Matt Creed – back cover photography
