= All Life Long =

Studio album by Kali Malone
- Released: February 9, 2024
- Recorded: 2020–2023
- Genre: Drone
- Length: 78:13
- Label: Ideologic Organ

Kali Malone chronology
Does Spring Hide Its Joy (2023)	All Life Long (2024)	Burning Song (2026)

All Life Long is an album by American composer Kali Malone, released on February 9, 2024, through Ideologic Organ. It was recorded between 2020 and 2023, with contributions from the Macadam Ensemble and Anima Brass. It received acclaim from critics.

== Background ==
Several of the organ drone recordings on the album were first performed by Malone and Stephen O'Malley during a live-streamed performance as part of the 2021 Variations Festival in Nantes, France, accompanied by the Macadam Ensemble.

== Critical reception ==
Professional ratings
Aggregate scores
Source	Rating
Metacritic	84/100
Review scores
Source	Rating
Beats Per Minute	71%
The Guardian	4/5 stars
Loud and Quiet	8/10
Mojo	4/5 stars
The Observer	4/5 stars
Pitchfork	8.3/10
The Skinny	4/5 stars
Uncut	8/10

According to the review aggregator Metacritic, All Life Long received "universal acclaim" based on a weighted average score of 84 out of 100 from 10 critic scores.

Mojo felt that Malone's "ability to dominate a room with minimal musical movement is astonishing; this record lowers the temperature, heightens the sense, slows down life, frame by frame". Uncut stated that "the likes of 'No Sun to Burn' (for brass) or the nine-minute title track, will pull on the listener's heartstrings at least as much as it endorses the composer's process".

The Skinny's Patrick Gamble wrote that Malone's "rebellious sensibility, particularly in relation to the interplay between the sacred and the profane, continues throughout All Life Long, elaborating that the "cumulative effect is sublime and will leave even the most agnostic listener in a state of transcendental bliss". Jon Buckland of The Quietus found that All Life Long "eschews the electro acoustics of recent albums Living Torch and last year's epic Does Spring Hide Its Joy in favour of the organ dirges of breakthrough record, The Sacrificial Code" as "these carefully intoned shifts are allowed to hold court for lengthy periods. Giving us space and time to sit and consider the softly undulating nuances that creep into our attention throughout All Life Long".

Marc Weidenbaum of Pitchfork wrote that "on All Life Long, [Malone] is truly writing for brass ensemble, yielding a regal quality: less goth, more Sun King (minus the filigree of the Baroque era)". John Amen of Beats Per Minute commented that "the project often trades depth for breadth", concluding, "At times, Malone's 'magic eye' seems elusive. Other times, it comes gloriously into focus, shimmering like an elegant mirage".

=== Accolades ===
Year-end lists for All Life Long
Publication	List	Rank	Ref.
Louder Than War	Top 100 Albums of 2024	43	
The Wire	Releases of the Year (2024 Rewind)	24	

== Track listing ==
All Life Long track listing
No.	Title	Length
1.	"Passage Through the Spheres"	6:48
2.	"All Life Long (for Organ)"	8:38
3.	"No Sun to Burn (for Brass)"	3:12
4.	"Prisoned on Watery Shore"	7:37
5.	"Retrograde Canon"	4:16
6.	"Slow of Faith"	4:36
7.	"Fastened Maze"	11:21
8.	"No Sun to Burn (for Organ)"	10:05
9.	"All Life Long (for Voice)"	3:15
10.	"Moving Forward"	6:12
11.	"Formation Flight"	2:38
12.	"The Unification of Inner & Outer Life"	9:35
Total length:		78:13

== Charts ==
Chart performance for All Life Long
Chart (2024)	Peak position
UK Album Downloads (Official Charts)	15
UK Independent Albums (Official Charts)	26
