= Hampus Lindwall =

Swedish organist

Hampus Lindwall (born 1976 in Stockholm, Sweden) is a Swedish organist, composer, and improviser known for his work in contemporary, experimental, and electronic music, often in relation to the organ. Since 2005, he has been titular organist at the Church of Saint-Esprit in Paris.

== Life and work ==
Lindwall grew up in Stockholm in a musical family and began his musical career in the 1990s as a guitarist in rock, metal, and jazz bands. He later turned to keyboard instruments and the organ. He studied at the Royal College of Music in Stockholm, where his teachers included Torvald Torén and Anders Bondeman. From 2002, he continued his studies in France at the Conservatoire de Saint-Maur-des-Fossés and the Conservatoire National Supérieur de Musique in Lyon, where he studied with Eric Lebrun, Pierre Pincemaille, and Loïc Mallié. He also studied privately with Rolande Falcinelli.

He has performed at institutions and festivals including the Philharmonie de Paris and the Festival d’Automne in Paris, where he has premiered works by composers such as Raphaël Cendo and Édith Canat de Chizy, and collaborated with artists including Stephen O’Malley.

He has premiered works by contemporary composers including Noriko Baba in recordings made at Radio France.

== Recordings ==
He has released recordings on labels including Ligia Digital, Clean Feed Records, Firework Editions, Matière-Mémoire, SUPERPANG, and Blank Forms.

His 2021 album Lost and Found, released on the label Matière-Mémoire, was described by Boomkat as featuring “virtuosic acid solos” performed on a Roland TB-303.

His 2025 album Brace for Impact was reviewed in The Wire, where Lucy Thraves described its organ writing as “dense, virtuosic, angular and involved” and noted its emphasis on compositional system-building and in The Quietus, which highlighted its exploration of the organ’s “textures and resonances” and its use of syncopated, off-kilter rhythms and dissonance.
