= Lucy Railton =

British musician

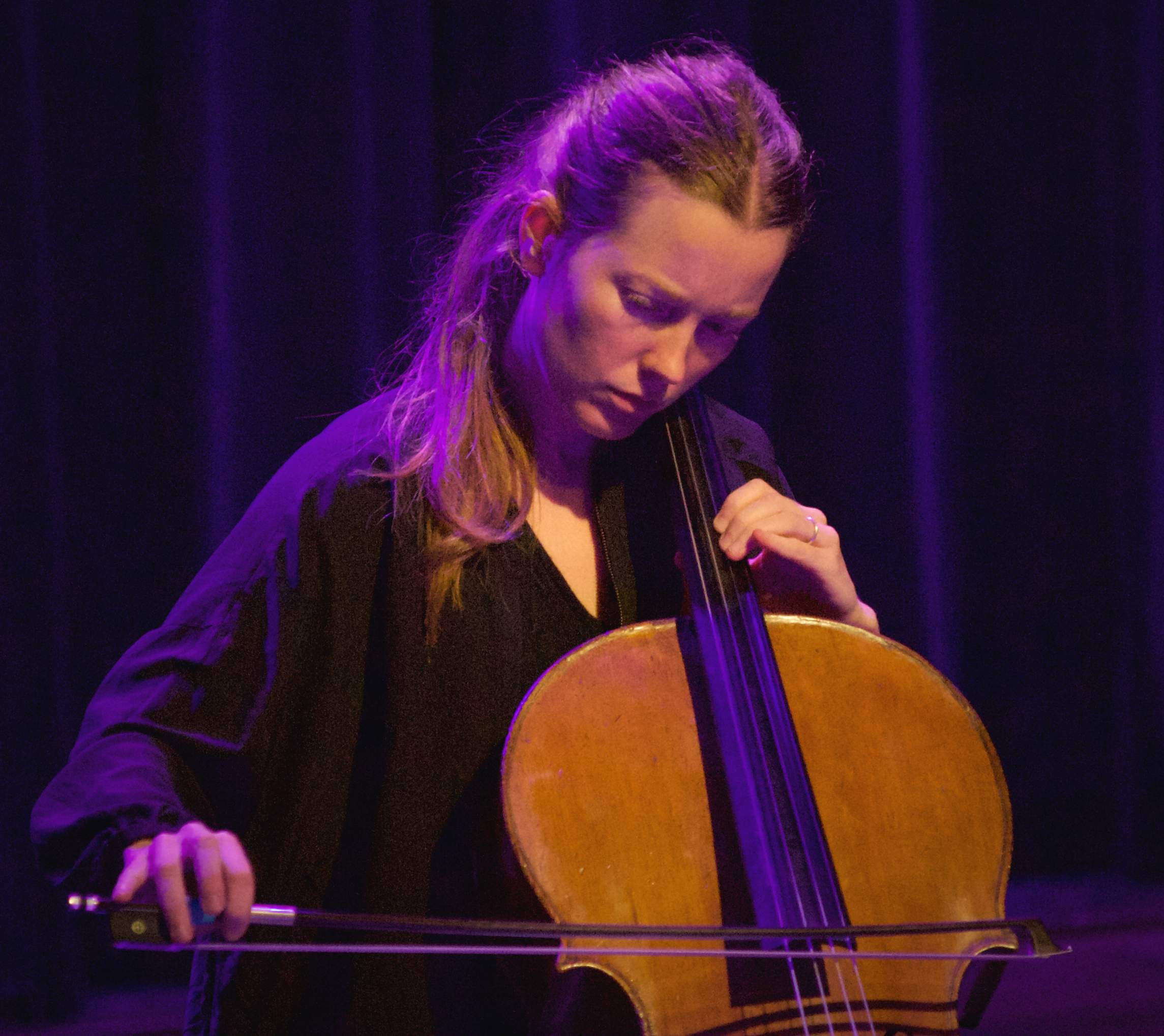
- Railton performing in 2021

Background information
- Origin: London, England, UK
- Genres: Improvisation; drone; ambient
- Occupation: Musician
- Instrument: Cello
- Years active: 2005–present
- Labels: Editions Mego; Ideologic Organ; Modern Love
- Website: lucyrailton.com

Lucy Railton is a British musician, primarily known for playing cello.

== Biography ==
Railton studied cello at the New England Conservatory in Boston, and at the Royal Academy of Music in London, where she graduated in 2008.

In the field of improvisational music, Railton has undertaken collaborations and shared performances with Kit Downes, Thomas Strønen, Aisha Orazabayeva, and Sofia Jernberg, among others. Railton has also appeared on recordings by numerous jazz, folk, electronic, and indie rock artists, including Bat for Lashes, Bonobo, and Jamie Cullum.

Railton founded the new music series Kammer Klang at Cafe Oto in 2008, which she curated for ten years; she later co-founded the London Contemporary Music Festival.

In recent years she has also worked with artists such as Russell Haswell, Rebecca Salvadori, Catherine Lamb, Beatrice Dillon, Kali Malone, and Kadialy Kouyate, as well as writer Laura Grace Ford and choreographers Akram Khan and Sasha Milavic Davies. She has also been involved in projects by Pauline Oliveros, Iancu Dumitrescu, Mary Jane Leach, Cally Spooner, Matmos, and Philippe Parreno. Her collaborations with some of these artists and their repertoire have led to extensive exploration of resonance, psychoacoustics, synthesis and microtonality, themes present in her own work.

In addition, Railton has worked as a soloist and chamber musician, alongside playing with ensembles such as London Sinfonietta, Britten Sinfonia, and Ensemble Plus Minus. In her programs as a soloist, she has interpreted canonical works, such as those by J.S. Bach or Giacinto Scelsi, as well as pieces by lesser-known and younger composers. Her interpretation of Louange à l’Éternité de Jésus by Olivier Messiaen was released by Modern Love as a benefit single.

She released a solo cello album, Blue Veil, in 2025 through Ideologic Organ.

== Discography ==
Year	Title	Label	Notes
2016	Scelsi EP	SN Variations	Giacinto Scelsi’s “Duo for violin and cello”
2018	Paradise 94	Modern Love	Featured contributions from Beatrice Dillon and Kit Downes
2020	Forma	GRM Portrait Series / Editions Mego	Split release with Max Eilbacher
2020	RFG Inventions for Cello and Computer	PAN	Collaboration with Peter Zinovieff
2020	5 S-Bahn	Boomkat	Incorporating field recordings of Berlin S-Bahn
2020	Olivier Messiaen — Louange à l'éternité de Jésus	Modern Love	10-inch EP
2021	False Positive	Lakeshore Records	Film soundtrack, collaboration with Yair Elazar Glotman
2021	Lament in Three Parts	TakuRoku	Digital label of Cafe Oto
2021	Subaerial	SN Variations	Collaboration with Kit Downes
2021	Three Or One	ECM New Series	Works by J.S. Bach, performed by Fred Thomas, Aisha Orazbayeva, and Lucy Railton
2023	Fragments of Reincarnation	Another Timbre	Collaboration with Michiko Ogawa
2023	Corner Dancer	Modern Love	Solo album
2025	Blue Veil	Ideologic Organ	Solo album
