= Daughters of Divine Love =

Roman Catholic religious congregation for women

The Daughters of Divine Love Congregation, a Catholic pontifical and international order of religious women was founded by Bishop Godfrey Mary Paul Okoye on July 16, 1969, in Nigeria, during the Nigerian Civil War (Biafra War). The congregation has over 900 sisters ministering in 15 countries around the world. The members pronounce the public vows of chastity, poverty and obedience, and dedicate themselves to contemplation and apostolic work. The congregation, recognized by their blue veil, serves in the following countries:

- Africa: Cameroon, Gabon, Kenya, Mali, Nigeria, Chad
- Europe: England, Austria, Germany, Italy, Switzerland, Belgium
- Americas: Cuba, Jamaica, Haiti, United States

== Retreat houses and conference centers ==
In addition to their various other missionary activities and convents in 15 countries, the sisters operate a retreat house and conference center near Abuja, the capital of Nigeria, which has been used by the Catholic Bishops' Conference of Nigeria for their meetings.
