= Kali Malone =

American composer and organist

- Also known as: Medicine Bow
- Born: 1994 (age 31–32); Colorado, U.S.
- Origin: Denver, Colorado, U.S.
- Genres: Drone; minimalism; electroacoustic
- Occupations: Composer; musician
- Instruments: Pipe organ; synthesizer
- Years active: 2014–present
- Labels: XKatedral; Bleak Environment; Hallow Ground; iDEAL Recordings; Portraits GRM; Ideologic Organ
- Spouse: Stephen O'Malley (m. 2023)
- Website: kalimalone.com

Kali Malone (born 1994) is an American composer and organist based in Stockholm. Her works implement unique tuning systems in minimalist form for analog and digital synthesis often combined with acoustic instrumentation.

== Early life ==
Malone was raised in Denver, Colorado. She moved to Western Massachusetts to study music, but relocated to Stockholm in 2012 after befriending the Swedish avant-garde composer Ellen Arkbro. She studied electroacoustic composition at the Royal College of Music, Stockholm.

== Career ==
In 2016 she co-founded the record label and concert series XKatedral, together with Maria W Horn, in Stockholm.

In 2019, she released The Sacrificial Code, featuring nearly two hours of pipe organ compositions, through iDEAL Recordings. The album appeared on year-end lists by Pitchfork and The Wire, and was awarded "2019 Album of the Year" by Boomkat.

In 2022, she released Living Torch, a 33-minute piece presented in two movements. It was commissioned by the Groupe de Recherches Musicales (GRM) for its loudspeaker orchestra, the Acousmonium. Jettisoning Malone's signature pipe organ, it features a mélange of acoustic and electronic instruments including the trombone and bass clarinet. It was composed by Malone in 11-odd limit just intonation. The trombone and bass clarinet were recorded in meticulous individual parts to match each computer-generated sound wave. It was assembled by Malone with heavily textured drones as well as the boîte à bourdon and sounds generated by the ARP 2500 synthesizer owned by Éliane Radigue. Malone composed and produced the album at the GRM in Paris between 2020 and 2021. It is the first collaboration between the GRM and its new label partner Shelter Press, continuing the Portraits GRM record series founded by Peter Rehberg of Editions Mego. The album premiered at the GRM in October 2021, three months after Rehberg's death, and was released by Portraits GRM on July 7, 2022.

In 2023, she released Does Spring Hide Its Joy, a collaboration with Sunn O))) guitarist Stephen O'Malley and British cellist Lucy Railton. It was composed and recorded between March and May 2020 in the empty concert halls of Berlin Funkhaus and Monom during the COVID-19 pandemic lockdown. Malone plays tuned sine wave oscillators on the album, joined by O'Malley's electric guitar and Railton's cello. The album consists of an hour-long composition presented in three versions, each a minor variation on the titular piece. It was released through O'Malley's Ideologic Organ label on January 20, 2023.

On May 14, 2023, deeming Malone's music "profanatory", activists from the French integralist movement Civitas forced the cancellation of one of her and O'Malley's concerts at the Saint-Cornély church in Carnac, Brittany, after they blocked the entrance of the church.

== Personal life ==
Malone is married to Sunn O))) guitarist Stephen O'Malley, which they announced on Instagram in July 2023.

== Discography ==
=== Studio albums ===
Title	Details
Velocity of Sleep	Released: August 25, 2017; Label: XKatedral, Bleak Environment
Cast of Mind	Released: May 8, 2018; Label: Hallow Ground
The Sacrificial Code	Released: June 27, 2019; Label: iDEAL Recordings
Living Torch	Released: July 7, 2022; Label: Portraits GRM
Does Spring Hide Its Joy (with Stephen O'Malley and Lucy Railton)	Released: January 20, 2023; Label: Ideologic Organ
All Life Long	Released: February 9, 2024; Label: Ideologic Organ
Magnetism (with Drew McDowall)	Released: November 9, 2025; Label: Ideologic Organ
Music for Intersecting Planes (with Leila Bordreuil)	Released: March 27, 2026; Label: Ideologic Organ
Burning Song	Released: October 30, 2026; Label: Ideologic Organ

=== Compilation albums ===
Title	Details
XKatedral Volume III (with Caterina Barbieri and Ellen Arkbro)	Released: October 6, 2017; Label: XKatedral
Studies for Organ (Rehearsal Demo Tape)	Released: May 1, 2020; Label: Self-released

=== EPs ===
Title	Details
Tragic Chorus	Released: March 12, 2016; Label: XKatedral, Bleak Environment
Black Gate	Released: December 21, 2016; Label: Total Black
Organ Dirges 2016–2017	Released: March 15, 2018; Label: Ascetic House
The Torrid Eye (with Acronym)	Released: January 23, 2019; Label: Stilla Ton

=== Other ===
==== With Morbida ====
Title	Details
Morbida / Medicine Bow	Released: November 2014; Label: Oma333

==== With Taxi Taxi ====
Title	Details
Floating Forever	Released: December 3, 2014; Label: Delicious Demon Records

==== With Hästköttskandalen ====
Title	Details
Spacegirls	Released: February 16, 2015; Label: Fylkingen Records

==== With Swap Babies ====
Title	Details
Bloody from Digging	Released: June 4, 2015; Label: XKatedral, Delicious Demon Records

==== With Sorrowing Christ ====
Title	Details
Sorrowing Christ	Released: August 31, 2016; Label: Ascetic House

==== With Golden Offence Orchestra ====
Title	Details
Ode to Pauline Oliveros	Released: August 23, 2017; Label: XKatedral
