= ARP 2500 =

Modular monophonic analog synthesizer

2500
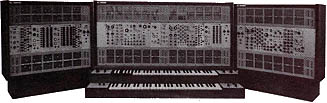
- ARP 2500
- Manufacturer: ARP Instruments, Inc.
- Dates: 1970–1981
- Price: US$7180 - US$19920

Technical specifications
- Polyphony: Duophonic
- Timbrality: Monotimbral
- Oscillator: 1004p; 1004r; 1004t; 1023
- Synthesis type: Analog Subtractive
- Storage memory: none
- Effects: none

Input/output
- Keyboard: 3002 Two voice, 5 octaves; 3222 Four voice, split, 5 octaves

The ARP 2500 is a monophonic (or duophonic) analog modular synthesizer. It was the first product of ARP Instruments, built from 1970 to 1981. Although only about 100 units were made, Sound on Sound magazine later called it "undoubtedly one of the most important electronic musical instruments ever made." It is notable for being programmed via matrix switches instead of conventional patch cables. Demand for smaller and more affordable instruments led ARP to develop the semi-modular ARP 2600 and the fixed-architecture ARP Odyssey.

== Features ==
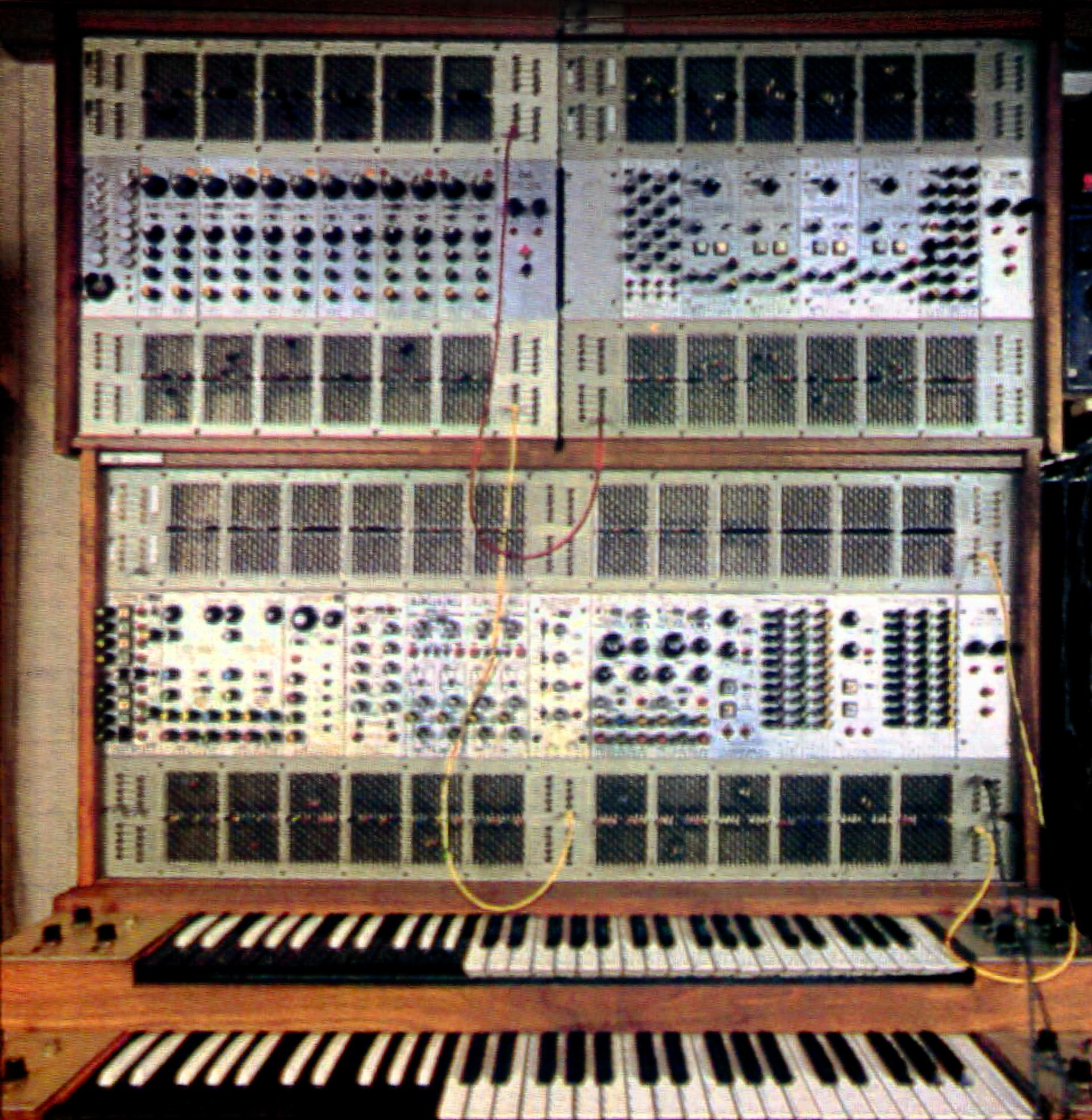
Arp 2500

Initially made by Alan Pearlman’s company Tonus as the Series 2000 system, the company subsequently changed its name to ARP, after Pearlman's initials, and renamed the Series 2000 to the ARP 2500.

Designed by Alan Pearlman, Dennis Colin, and David Friend, the 2500 was advertised as having two major advantages over other synths: voltage-controlled oscillators with stable tuning and matrix switches instead of patch cords. The oscillators combined Alan Pearlman’s patented exponential converters with a dual core design, resulting in good tuning stability compared to competitors.

The sliding matrix switches found above and below the modules and are the main method of connection between modules and from the keyboards to the modules. There are rows of 1/8" jacks at the end of each row of matrix switches to interconnect rows of switches with wing cabinets or to serve as inputs and outputs. Keyboard connections are connected by default to the top left mini-jacks. Other major new features introduced in the 2500 were duophonic keyboards and a state variable filter. The main 2500 cabinet can hold 15 modules, and optional wing cabinets can each hold eight. The matrix switch interconnection scheme allow any module's output to connect to any other module's input. Unlike the patch cords found on the modular synths of competitors like Moog and Buchla, the matrix implementation enabled a cable-free experience. However, the matrix switches developed a reputation for dirty connections and crosstalk.

The earliest 2000 series cabinets could hold eight, fifteen, or nineteen modules. The later cabinets were taller, and available in 8 or 15 modules sizes. There was also a portable 8 module version, which they marketed as an expansion of the later 2600.

A range of five-octave keyboard options were available, including monophonic, split, duophonic, and dual versions. Split keyboards have one or two left octaves with reverse-colored keys, and either section could be monophonic or duophonic, offering control of up to four voices on a single keyboard.

Although the 2500 proved reliable and user-friendly, it was not commercially successful. Systems could cost up to $20,000, almost half the average US house price at that time, and the 2500 was introduced at a time when sales of large modular synthesizers were starting to fall, so they only sold approximately 100 units. ARP initially produced fourteen different modules, with many more planned to follow, but few of these prototypes made it into production.

=== Modules ===
- 1001 Blank module
- 1002 Power control
- 1003 Dual envelope generator
- 1003a Dual envelope generator
- 1004 Voltage-controlled oscillator
- 1004p Voltage-controlled oscillator with mix pots
- 1004r Voltage-controlled oscillator with mix rocker switches
- 1004t Voltage-controlled oscillator with mix toggle switches
- 1005 Modamp (Ring modulator and voltage-controlled amplifier)
- 1006 Filtamp (Voltage-controlled low-pass filter and voltage-controlled amplifier)
- 1016 Dual noise and random voltage source
- 1023 Dual voltage-controlled oscillator
- 1026 Preset voltages
- 1027 Ten-stage sequencer
- 1033 Dual delayed envelope generator
- 1036 Dual sample and hold
- 1045 Voltage-controlled voice (oscillator, filter, amplifier, and two envelope generators)
- 1046 Quad envelope generator (1003a & 1033 in one module)
- 1047 Multimode voltage-controlled filter
- 1050 Mixer/sequencer

Three additional modules existed only as prototypes or mock-ups: the 1012 Convenience module, the 1035 Triple modulator, and the 1040 Noiselator.

A collection of the 2500's most popular modules was redesigned into a single, semi-modular unit as the ARP 2600, leaving out the matrix switching and adding some new functions.

== Notable users and appearances ==
John Kongos first used one at Trident Studios in 1971, then in 1973 he acquired his own - it was used extensively at his Tapestry Studio, on his own recordings as well as with Def Leppard (Pyromania), Mutt Lange, Alain Chamfort, Tony Visconti, Ryan Ulyate and many others.

In 1972 Pete Townshend of the Who used an ARP 2500 on the Who's Quadrophenia.

The ARP 2500 was extensively used by British producer David Hentschel on recordings such as "Funeral for a Friend/Love Lies Bleeding" from Elton John's 1973 album Goodbye Yellow Brick Road. Jeff Wayne's 1978 multi-platinum selling album War of the Worlds features the ARP 2500, including the sound of Martian speech.

Jazz pianist Paul Bley used a 2500 on his Synthesizer Show album and in his live shows.

In the 1977 film Close Encounters of the Third Kind, a 2500 unit is used to communicate with aliens. Phil Dodds, ARP's Vice President of Engineering, was on set to install and manage the synthesizer; Steven Spielberg, liking his looks, cast him on the spot as an extra to play the 2500. The unit featured in the film consisted of a fully loaded main unit, two fully loaded wing cabinets and dual keyboards in a custom case. It was damaged by the artificial fog used on set.

Composer Éliane Radigue worked almost exclusively with the 2500 from 1974 to 2000.

It has also been used by artists such as Aphex Twin, David Bowie, Vince Clarke, Ekseption, Faust, John Frusciante, Jean Michel Jarre, CEvin Key, Kraftwerk, Jimmy Page, and Vangelis.
