= ARP Instruments =

Manufacturer of electronic musical instruments

- Founded: 1969
- Founder: Alan R. Pearlman
- Defunct: 2015
- Headquarters: Lexington, Massachusetts, United States
- Products: Electronic musical instruments

ARP Instruments, Inc. was a Lexington, Massachusetts manufacturer of electronic musical instruments, founded by Alan Robert Pearlman (Note: The name of founder Alan Robert Pearlman seems to be sometimes possibly incorrectly described as "Alan Richard Pearlman", as seen as below: "'Alan Richard Pearlman': 4 results". Google Books Search.; Eberhard Höhn (1979). Elektronische Musik: Klangfarben, Klangentwicklung, Klangspiele. Hueber-Holzmann. p. 120. "ARP: Amerikanischer Synthesizerhersteller, benannt nach dem Begründer Alan Richard PEARLMAN. (German: "ARP: American synthesizer manufacturer, named after founder Alan Richard PEARLMAN.")") in 1969. It created a popular and commercially successful range of synthesizers throughout the 1970s before declaring bankruptcy in 1981. The company earned a reputation for producing excellent sounding, innovative instruments and was granted several patents for the technology it developed.

== History ==
=== Background ===
Alan Pearlman was an engineering student at Worcester Polytechnic Institute, Massachusetts in 1948 when he foresaw the coming age of electronic music and synthesizers. He later wrote "The electronic instrument's value is chiefly as a novelty. With greater attention on the part of the engineer to the needs of the musician, the day may not be too remote when the electronic instrument may take its place ... as a versatile, powerful, and expressive instrument."

=== Beginnings ===
Following 21 years of experience in electronic engineering and entrepreneurship, Pearlman founded the company in 1969 with $100,000 of personal funds and a matching amount from investors, with fellow engineering graduate David Friend on board from the beginning as the co-founder of the company. The company derived its name from Pearlman's initials, and existed briefly as the ARP Instrument Division of Tonus, Inc. Their first instrument, the ARP 2500, was released the following year. It was marketed for use in academic contexts as "The concert grand of synthesizers."

=== Success ===
The ARP 2600 began production in 1971. As an engineer, Pearlman had little understanding of the music industry or its potential audience. He felt the best market for synthesizers would be music departments at schools and universities, and designed the instrument to be easy to use for this reason. David Friend and musician Roger Powell toured the US demonstrating the 2600 to various musicians and dealers, and it quickly became a popular instrument. The first significant user of the 2600 was Edgar Winter, who connected the keyboard controller of the 2600 to the main unit via a long extension cord, allowing him to wear the synth around his neck like a keytar. Stevie Wonder was an early adopter of the 2600, who had the control panel instructions labelled in Braille.

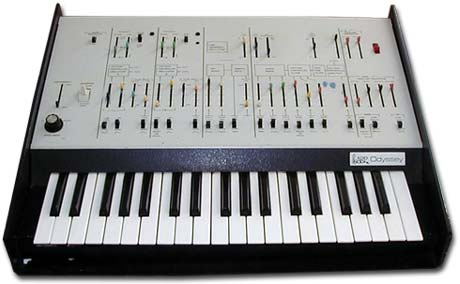
Odyssey (rev.1)

Throughout the 1970s, ARP was the main competitor to Moog Music and eventually surpassed Moog to become the world's leading manufacturer of electronic musical instruments. Performers found that ARP synthesizers were better at staying in tune than Moogs owing to superior oscillator design. The 2500 used a matrix-signal switching system instead of patch cords on a Moog, which led to some performers complaining about crosstalk between signal paths. The 2600 on the other hand, used hardwired ("normaled") signal paths that could be modified with switch settings, or completely overridden using patch cords.

There were two main camps among synthesizer musicians—the Minimoog players and the ARP Odyssey/ARP 2600 players—with most proponents dedicated to their choice, although some players decided to pick and choose between the two for specific effect, as well as many who dabbled with products produced by other manufacturers. Notably, the 2500 was featured in the hit movie Close Encounters of the Third Kind; ARP's Vice President of Engineering, Phillip Dodds, was sent to install the unit on the movie set and was subsequently cast as Jean Claude, the musician who played the now famous five-note sequence on the huge synthesizer in an attempt to communicate with the alien mothership.

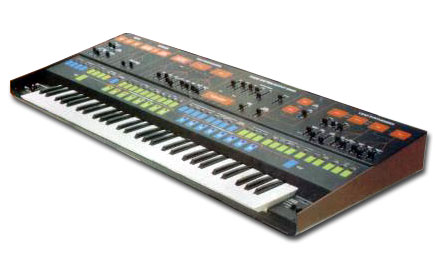
Quadra

The Odyssey was released in 1972. It was designed as a cut-down version of the 2600 for touring musicians, competing with the Minimoog, and contained a three-octave keyboard. Later versions featured a pressure-pad operated pitch control system.

The best selling ARP synthesizer was the Omni, released in 1975. It was a fully polyphonic keyboard that used top-octave divide-down oscillators that had been used on electronic organs, and competed with the Polymoog. In 1977, the company peaked financially with $7 million sales. The Quadra was released the following year, and contained a number of synthesizer modules combined and controlled by a microprocessor.

=== Decline ===
The demise of ARP Instruments stemmed from financial difficulties following development of the ARP Avatar, a synthesizer module virtually identical to the ARP Odyssey without a keyboard and intended to be played by a solid body electric guitar via a specially-mounted hexaphonic guitar pickup whose signals were then processed through discrete pitch-to-voltage converters.

Although an excellent, groundbreaking instrument by all accounts, the Avatar failed to sell well. ARP Instruments was never able to recoup the research and development costs associated with the Avatar project and after several more attempts to produce successful instruments such as the ARP Quadra, ARP 16-Voice and 4-Voice Pianos, and the ARP Solus, the company finally declared bankruptcy in May 1981.

During the liquidation process, the liquidators ordered Philip Dodds, chief engineer at ARP, to sell the assets. He managed to sell the 4-Voice Piano and a working prototype of the ARP Chroma—the company's most sophisticated instrument design to date—to CBS Musical Instruments for $350,000. Dodds reassembled the former ARP development team at CBS to complete the Chroma primary the software and manufacturing now as Rhodes Chroma. It was produced from 1982 to late 1983. The instrument has a flexible voice architecture, 16-note polyphony, weighted, wooden keyboard action with 256 velocity levels, a single slider parameter editing system (subsequently implemented on the Yamaha DX7); and the inclusion of a proprietary digital interface system that predated MIDI.

=== Aftermath ===
In 2015, almost three and a half decades after it closed its doors, the company's second flagship instrument, the ARP Odyssey, was brought back into production by Korg, working in collaboration with David Friend, Alan Pearlman's co-founder at ARP.

== Products ==
- 1970: ARP 2500 analog modular synthesizer, patched with a switch matrix, noted for its reliable tuning compared to competitors Moog and Buchla
- 1972: ARP Odyssey analog synthesizer, a Minimoog competitor.
- 1975: ARP Omni polyphonic synthesizer
