= ARP Odyssey =

Electronic musical instrument developed by ARP Instruments

Odyssey
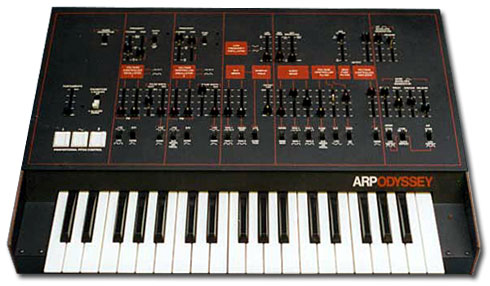
- ARP Odyssey Mark III
- Manufacturer: ARP Instruments, Inc. Korg Inc. (from 2015)
- Dates: 1972–1981; 2015–present

Technical specifications
- Polyphony: 1-2
- Oscillator: 2
- LFO: Sine, Square, S&H
- Synthesis type: Analog Subtractive
- Attenuator: AR, ADSR
- Storage memory: none
- Effects: none

Input/output
- Keyboard: 37-key
- Left-hand control: Pitch
- External control: CV/Gate

The ARP Odyssey is an analog synthesizer introduced by ARP Instruments in 1972.

== History ==
ARP developed the Odyssey as a direct competitor to the Moog Minimoog and an answer to the demand for more affordable, portable, and less complicated "performance" synthesizers.

ARP produced several versions of the Odyssey from 1972 to 1980. In early 2015, Korg reissued the Odyssey in cooperation with the original designer and ARP co-founder, David Friend.

== Design ==
The Odyssey is a two-oscillator analog synthesizer, and one of the first with duophonic capabilities (the ability to play two notes at the same time). All parameters, including a resonant low-pass filter, a non-resonant high-pass filter, ADSR and AR envelopes, a sine and square wave LFO, and a sample-and-hold function are controllable with sliders and switches on the front panel.

=== Features ===
- Switchable between sawtooth, square, and pulse waveforms with oscillator sync, a "ring modulator", and pink or white noise. (As with the Korg MS-20, the "ring modulator" is actually a logical exclusive-OR between the two VCOs' pulse waves.)
- Pulse-width can be modulated manually or with the LFO or the ADSR envelope generator. There is a (static) high-pass filter, as well as a voltage controlled low-pass self-oscillating filter.
- The filter can be controlled by either of the two envelope generators, an ADSR (attack, decay, sustain, release) and a simple AR (attack, release) and modulated by the LFO, sample-and-hold, the keyboard, or a separate CV (pedal) input on the back panel.
- The Sample/Hold input mixer can be used to route the output of the VCOs to the FM input of VCO 2 and the VCF, enabling audio frequency FM.

== ARP Odyssey models ==
=== Odyssey Mk I (Model 2800) ===
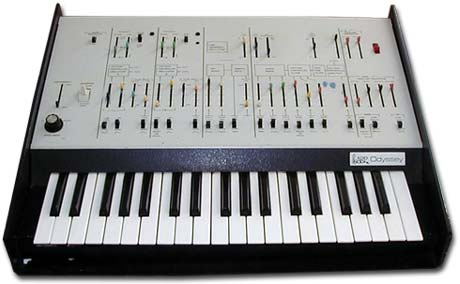
ARP Odyssey Mark I

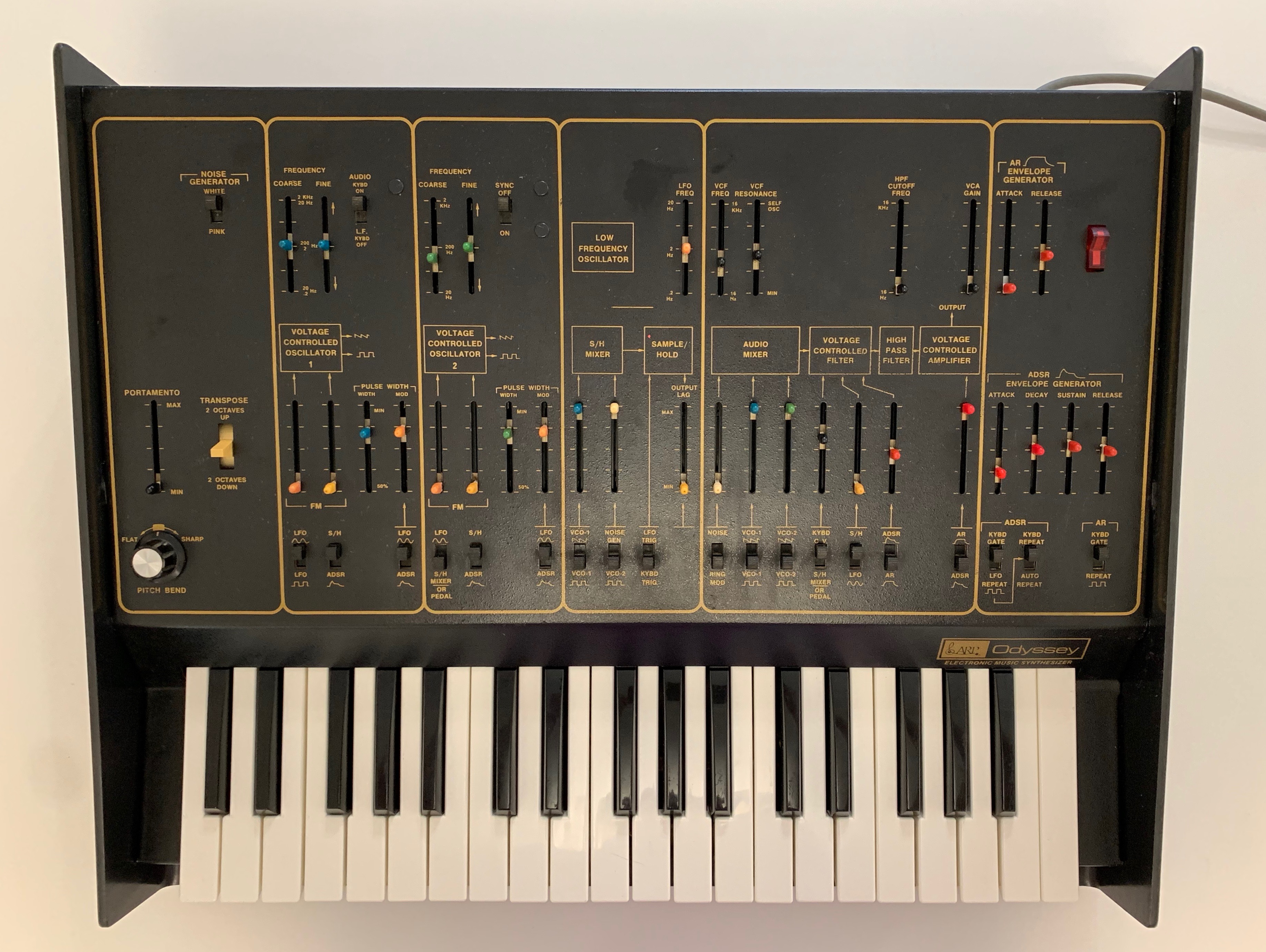
ARP Odyssey Mk1 - black/gold version

ARP Odysseys produced between 1972 and 1975, referred to as Mk I, were white-faced Odysseys that used a 2-pole voltage-controlled filter, which were similar to Oberheim SEM modules. Some late models used a black and gold color scheme and include CV/gate jacks like the later Mk II. These earlier units contained a greater number of internal adjustments and were slightly more difficult to calibrate.

=== Odyssey Mk II (Model 2810-2815) ===
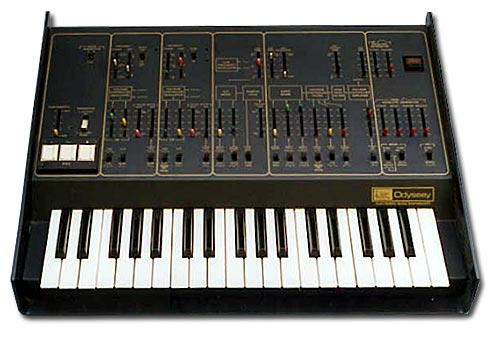
ARP Odyssey Mark II

Odyssey Mk IIs were produced between 1975 and 1978. They are largely similar to Mk Is; the main differences are the use of the black and gold color scheme and the inclusion of CV/gate in all models. These models also use a four-pole VCF, which were similar in design to Moog's four-pole filter. Subsequent models, however, use a different four-pole low-pass filter designed by ARP, the 4075 filter. A later filter with a similar design, the 4072, was used in the 2600, Omni, Axxe, Solus, and other ARP instruments.

=== Odyssey Mk III (Model 2820-2823) ===
Odyssey Mk III was introduced in 1978, with a redesigned chassis and orange-on-black color scheme consistent with other contemporary ARP instruments. The Mk III featured ARP's new four-pole "4075" filter, and have an unbalanced XLR output in addition to unbalanced 1/4" outputs. The rotary knob-controlled pitch bend featured on the Mk I and Mk II models was replaced by proportional pitch control (PPC), which utilized 3 pressure-sensitive buttons to control bend up, bend down, and vibrato. ARP included PPC on other instruments, and also offered a kit to add PPC to earlier Odyssey synthesizers.

Production of the Odyssey Mk III ceased when ARP Instruments declared bankruptcy in 1981.

== Software emulations ==
In 2002, GForce Software released Oddity, a software synthesizer version of the ARP Odyssey, with additional features like a sub oscillator and increased modulation options offered by X-LFO and X-ADSR.

On Nov 1, 2016 Korg announced the ARP ODYSSEi app for iOS.

UVI released the HX-Oddy in July of 2024, which included the addition of two layers of hardware-based wavetables and physically-modeled filters. This sample-based recreation of the ARP Odyssey MkI features over 13,000 samples and offers in-depth sample manipulation and modulation.

== Hardware re-issues and recreations ==
=== Korg ARP Odyssey ===
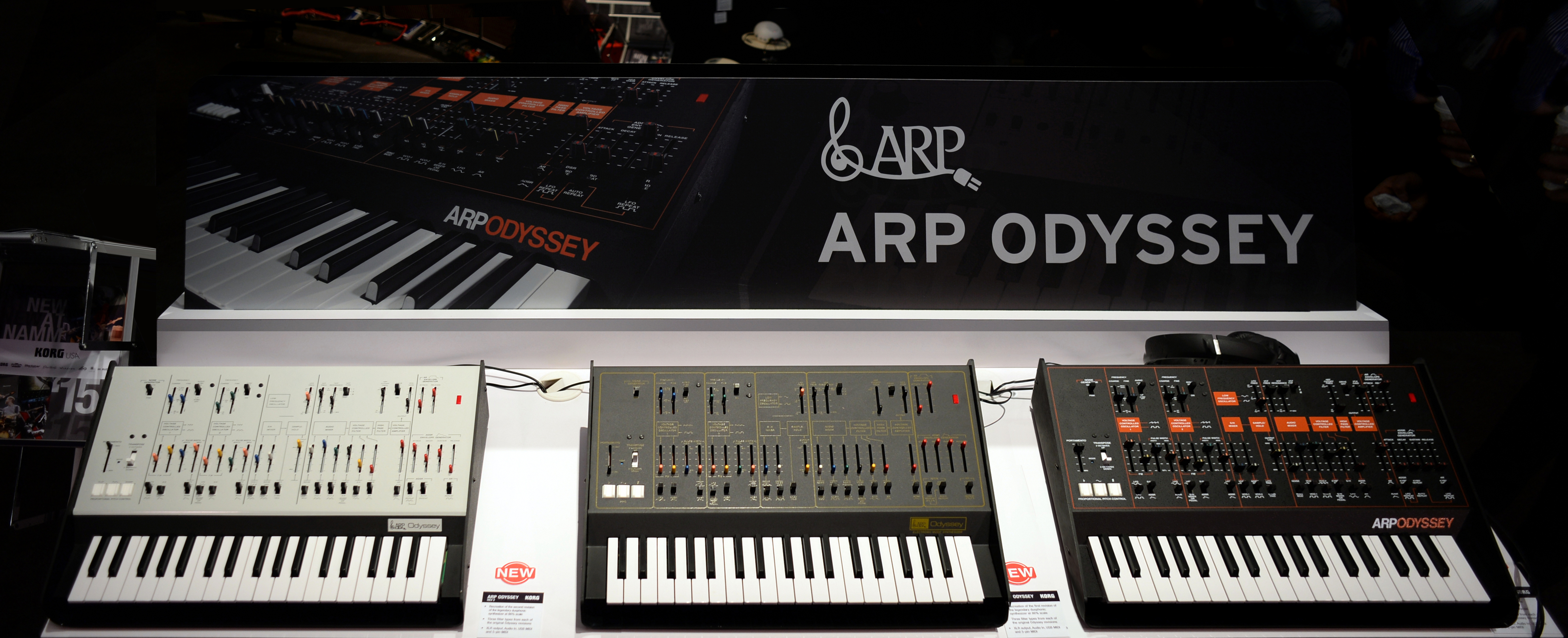
ARP Odyssey reissued by Korg in 2015

The ARP Odyssey was reissued by Korg in 2015. 86% of the size of the ARP's original Odyssey with a "slim keys" keyboard, the analog signal path of Korg's reissue is similar to the original, with several updates like MIDI input and USB MIDI connectivity, a separate headphone output and balanced XLR output, and a "drive" switch to add distortion to the voltage-controlled amplifier. Korg released Mark I and Mark II color schemes as limited editions, with the Mark III color scheme as the standard model. All three versions included the three filter circuits from the original Odyssey models, with the ability to switch between them. All models also featured the ability to switch between two portamento behaviors from the original models.

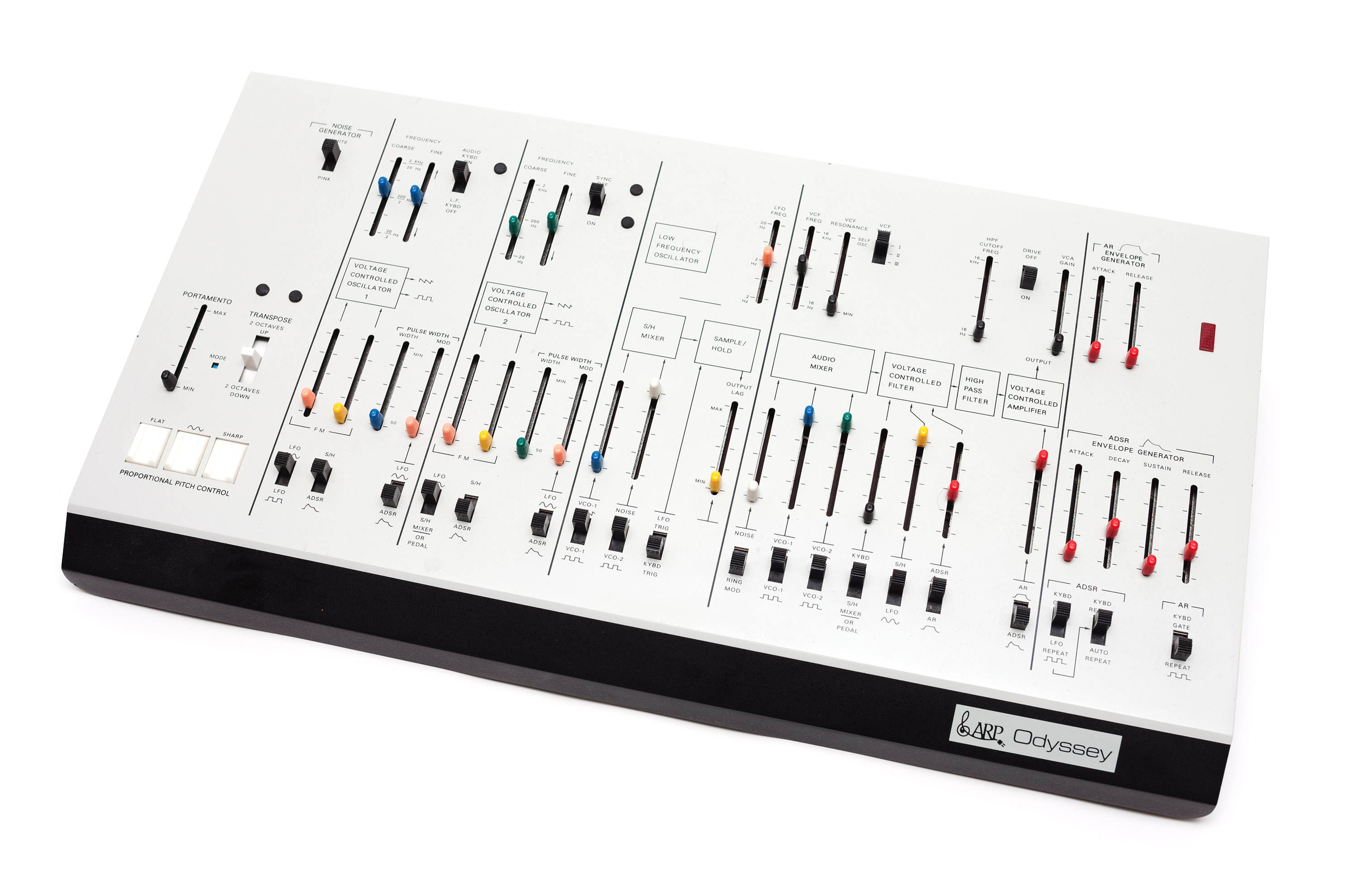
A Korg ARP Odyssey module

Korg later released an ARP Odyssey Module, consisting of the synthesizer and controls without the keyboard. Korg's ARP Odyssey Module features minor MIDI implementation improvements.

A limited edition, full-size reproduction of the original ARP Odyssey was released by Korg in all three classic color schemes as the ARP Odyssey FS.

=== Behringer Odyssey ===
In August 2019, Behringer released its own version of the Odyssey. Utilizing the orange-on-black color scheme of ARP's Odyssey Mark III, the Behringer Odyssey features a full-size 37-key keyboard and all three versions of the filter from the original ARP Odyssey models. Additional features not found on the original include MIDI, digital effects, a 32-step sequencer, and arpeggiator.
