= Timbrality =

Monotimbral (from the root prefix mono meaning one, and timbre meaning a specific tone of a sound independent of its pitch) is usually used in reference to electronic synthesizers which can produce a single timbre at a given pitch when pressing one key (if the synth is monophonic) or multiple keys (if the synth is polyphonic).

An electronic musical instrument may be multitimbral, which means it can produce two or more timbres (also called sounds or patches) at the same time. Instruments which may be multitimbral include synthesizers, samplers, and music workstations. A multitimbral instrument might be configurable in a variety of ways:

- Splitting the keyboard at a given point allows a musician to play, for example, a bass guitar sound with the left hand and a piano sound with the right hand.
- Layering timbres allows a musician to play, for example, a pipe organ sound and a string ensemble sound together.
- Combinations of keyboard splits and layers may be possible.
- An external sequencer might play an accompaniment of bass and drum sounds on the instrument (actuated through MIDI) while the musician plays a piano part on the keyboard of the same instrument.

== Background ==
Multitimbrality is achieved by having a synthesizer with more than one sound producing module. In a fully digital system, each sound module is virtual, since in reality algorithms combine samples together in real time for output to a single D-A (digital to analogue) circuit.

Synthesizers that can combine n timbres together are called n voice multitimbral. For example, a synthesizer capable of playing eight voices or timbres at one time would be an eight voice multitimbral instrument.

Multitimbrality is distinct from polyphony, which is the number of notes which can be played at the same time, not the number of different timbres. All multitimbral instruments are polyphonic, because they need to be able to play at least one note per timbre at a time, but not all polyphonic instruments are multitimbral.

== Applications ==
Inexpensive multitimbral synthesizers combined with a MIDI equipped computer made home studio recording much more accessible to the digital musician, particularly keyboard players. By capturing information digitally via MIDI, one could play back an entire work with several voices on a single multitimbral synthesizer. This, combined with a relatively cheap four track tape machine or higher-end 16 and 24 track reel-to-reel machines would allow a musician to layer a number of keyboard tracks digitally, and then use a single track for MIDI information and the rest for analogue sounds, without requiring intermediate mix-downs to gain additional needed synth tracks.
