= E-mu Proteus =

Range of digital sound modules and keyboards

Proteus
- Manufacturer: E-mu

Technical specifications
- Polyphony: up to 128 voices
- Timbrality: up to 128 notes
- Oscillator: Digital
- Synthesis type: Sample-based synthesis

Input/output

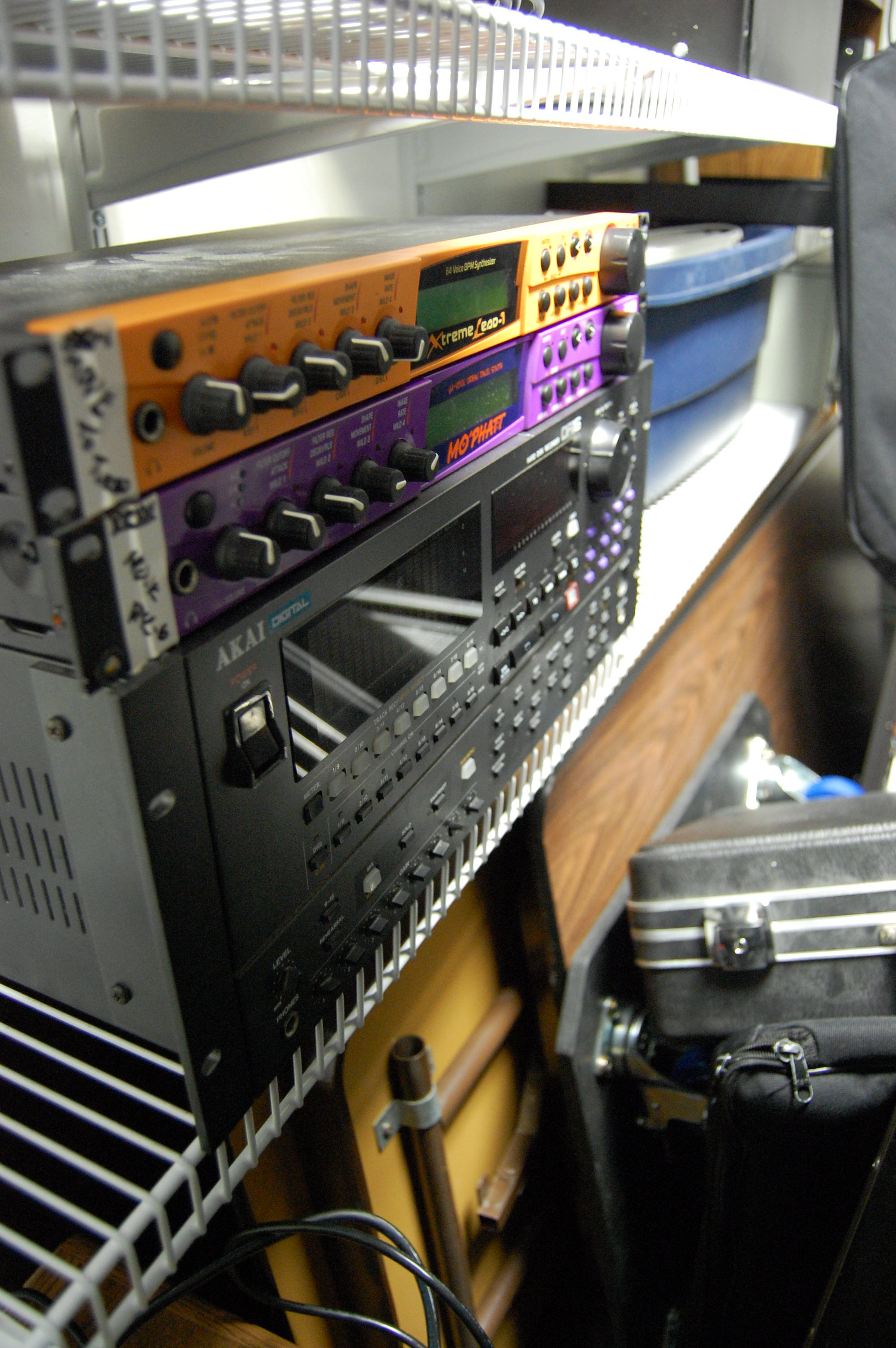
Two Proteus modules, the Xtreme Lead-1 and the Mo-Phatt, sit atop an Akai multi-track recorder, together forming a system typical of Hip hop production

The E-mu Proteus was a range of digital sound modules and keyboards manufactured by E-mu Systems from 1989 to 2002.

== History ==
E-mu Systems came to prominence in the early 1980s with its relatively affordable Emulator sampler, and subsequently pioneered sample-based synthesis technology with the Proteus range. Unlike earlier types of synthesizers, sample-based equipment does not derive its raw sounds from electronic oscillators or algorithmically generated waveforms, but from recorded sounds held in read-only memory (ROM) chips. These sounds may then be layered, filtered, modulated by low frequency oscillation and shaped by ADSR envelopes. However, unlike a true sampler, such devices do not allow the user to record sounds but instead offer a range of factory sounds suitable for any given use. This type of sound production dominated electronic music production for several years in the late 20th century. The exclusive license for re-formatting and managing historical E-MU Proteus sound content has been acquired by Digital Sound Factory.

== First generation ==
The original Proteus series are basic ROMplers which contains 3 base models with 192 patches each, of which 64 are editable by the user. The patches have an assigned sample and allow basic ADSR editing, and it's possible to link more than one patch together for a richer sound. The units have 32 voice polyphony.

The Proteus 1 contains general sounds from the Emulator library useful for music production, the Proteus 2 specializes in orchestral sounds, and the third model in sounds for world music. Additional versions include the following:

- XR versions have 256 slots editable by the user but are otherwise identical to the base models.
- The Proteus 1 Plus Orchestral model is a Proteus 1 XR with the sounds of the Proteus 1 and 2. It contains the ROM presets for the Proteus 1 and some from the Proteus 2.
- Proteus MPS (Master Performance System), a 61-key keyboard version of the first Proteus module. A Proteus MPS plus Orchestral was also available with sounds of the first two modules.
- The Proteus 1 can be expanded with the ProtoLogic daughterboard made by Invision Interactive, which adds 128 new presets based on 70 new waveforms.
- The Pro/cussion is a module dedicated to percussion sounds as well as tuned percussion instruments and miscellaneous synth presets.

Proteus 1 Pop/Rock (March 1989)
Proteus 1 XR (1989)
Proteus 1 Plus Orchestral (1990)
Proteus 2 Orchestral (January 1990)
Proteus 2 XR (1990)
Proteus 3 World (1991)
Proteus 3 XR (1991)
PRO/cussion (January 1991)

== Second generation ==
The second generation of E-MU ROMplers added filtering capabilities as well as proper FX options.

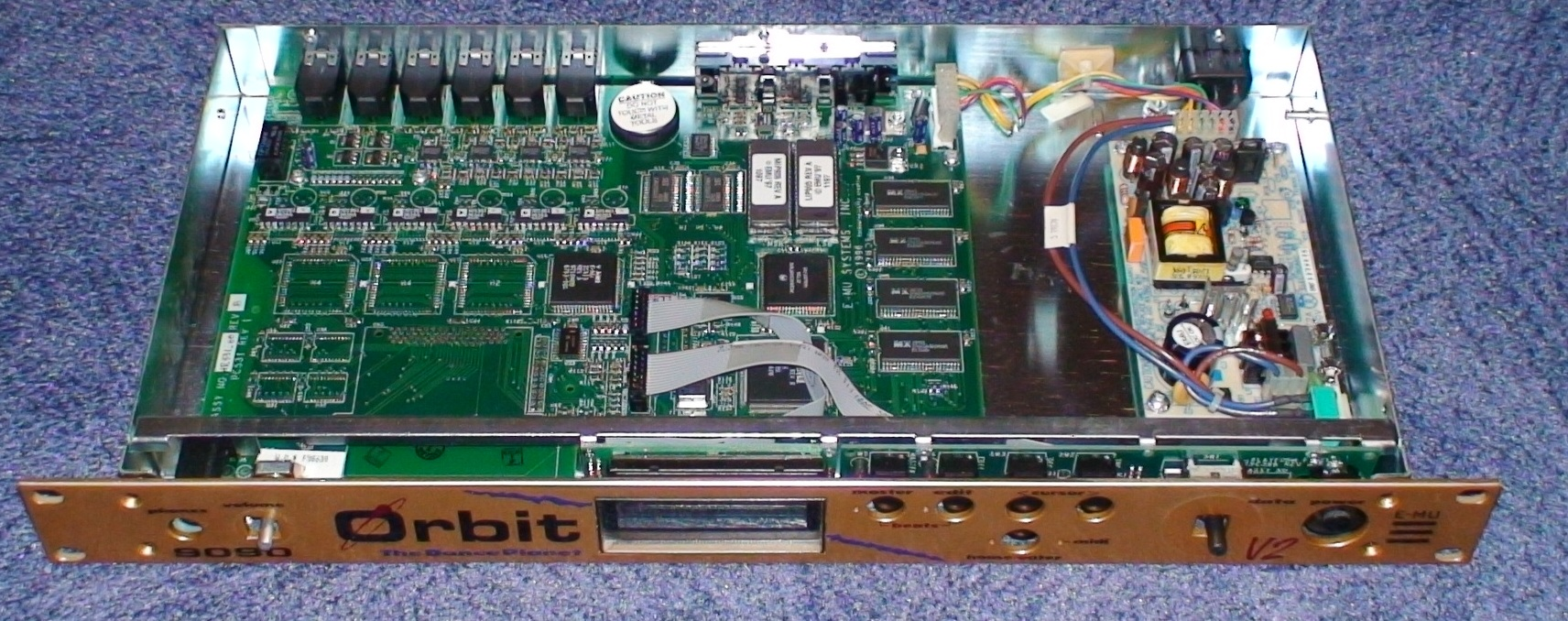
Internals of an ORBIT V2 with its beat mode: Beat Mode

- The first module based on the new DSP chip was the Vintage Keys, which added a low-pass filter. It was followed by the Vintage Keys Plus and Classic Keys in 1993 and 1994 respectively.
- The Morpheus added a complex filter engine with 197 filter presets, but it was not a commercial success.
- The Proteus FX is essentially a cost-reduced extended Proteus 1 plus Orchestral with the addition of built-in effects. It has 512 presets, of which 256 can be edited by the user. It uses an external power adapter and the additional sub inputs and outputs of the earlier models, which could be used for external effects, are not present.
- The UltraProteus is an extended Morpheus with the sounds of the three Proteus modules and more filter presets.
- The Planet Phatt module has sounds for Hip-Hop, the Orbit 9090 for Techno/Electronica, and the Carnaval for Latin music.

Vintage Keys (1993)
Morpheus (1993)
Vintage Keys Plus (1993)
Proteus FX (1994)
Classic Keys (1994)
UltraProteus (1994)
Orbit [Techno/Electronica] (1996)
Planet Phatt [Hip-Hop] (1997); Orbit V2 [Techno/Electronica] (1997)
Carnaval [Latin] (1997)

== Third generation ==
The Proteus 2000 released in 1999 was a 1U rack sound module based on the electronic music oriented Audity 2000, released in 1998. It contained many multi-purpose acoustic as well as synthetic sounds, among more than a thousand waves utilizing 32 megabytes of ROM. It featured up to 128 voices of polyphony and 32-part multi-timbrality. and could be expanded with slots for three additional sound ROM cards. A cheaper Proteus 1000 model was also introduced with the same soundset and ROM card but with a 64 voice polyphony and fewer individual sound outputs. The Proteus 2000 is also compatible with the Protozoa ROM expansion card, which contain 3 banks with the first 128 patches from each synth in the original Proteus trilogy, as well as a new bank consisting of patches made with the combined waveforms of all three modules and optimized for the expanded synthesis options of the Proteus 2000, adding up a total of 384 new patches in 16 MB of flash memory.

The Proteus 2000 range also consisted of several specialized models, some differing from each other only by the sound banks they contained. However, most of them allowed for four ROM chips to be mounted at the same time and users could swap the cards inside them, so in cases the rack unit itself was not necessairly indicative of the sounds inside the synth. The available ROM cards included Composer, a work-horse set of sounds useful for popular music production, three orchestral ROMs, the Vintage Pro collection consisting of tonewheel and electric organs, electric pianos and classic synthesizers, a card dedicated solely to the Hammond organ and a percussion ROM through Protean Drums. As well as the Orbit and Mo-Phatt collections, aimed at dance and urban genres, the Xtreme Lead, optimized for monophonic synthesizer solo sounds, the Ensoniq collaborative cards such as Sounds of the ZR and the Ensoniq Project plus the custom architecture built Holy Grail Piano. Most of these were sold as specialized modules while others such as the Protozoa, Sounds of the ZR and Holy Grail Piano cards were only available as separate orders, although the hardware inside most of them is virtually identical to the Proteus 2000.

Audity 2000 [Electronic/Dance] (1998)
Proteus 2000 [General] (1999)
Virtuoso 2000 [Orchestral] (2000)
Proteus Orchestra [Orchestral] (2000)
Xtreme Lead-1 [Techno/Electronica] (2000)
Mo'Phatt [Hip-Hop] (2000)
B-3 [Hammond Organ w/ Leslie Emulation] (2000)
Planet Earth [World music] (2000)
Orbit 3 [Techno/Dance/Electronica] (2001)
Proteus Custom [Shipped with specific ROM cards on order] (2002)
XL-1 Turbo [Techno] (2002)
Turbo Phatt [Hip-Hop] (2002)
Proteus 1000 [General] (2002)
Vintage Pro [Classic synthesizers] (2002)

== Proteus 2500 ==
This 4U rack model was designed to function as a rack-mounted, front-panel-programmable sound source. It was equipped with sixteen multi-function pads and the same number of programmable knobs and had an onboard sequencer.

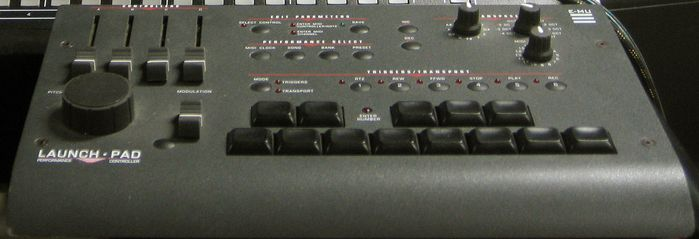
Launch-Pad controller for Orbit in 1996 may be a forerunner of Command Station

== Command Station ==
In 2001, the Proteus line of modules was repackaged in the form of a line of tabletop units, the XL7 and MP7 Command Stations, broadly similar to the rack-mounted 2500 in features but featuring touch-sensitive pads suitable for recording drum patterns.

== MK-6/PK-6/Halo ==
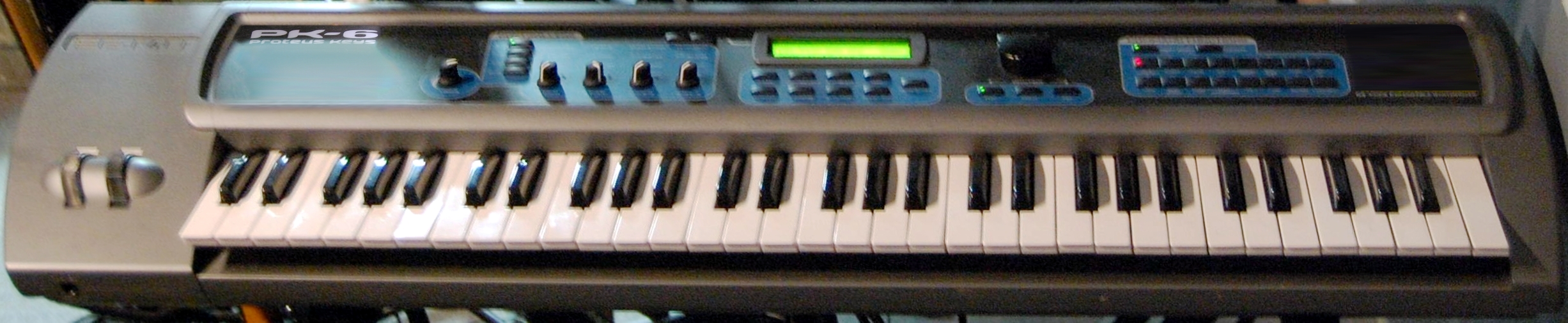
E-mu PK-6 (Pop/Rock) - 2001

In 2001–2002, E-mu/Ensoniq released a trio of entry-level keyboards, essentially the keyboard versions of the Proteus 2500 module. The E-mu MK-6, XK-6, PK-6 and Ensoniq Halo featured the same 61-key keyboard and controls layout, but slightly different soundset.

== Software editor ==
prodatum is a cross-platform software editor for the Proteus 1000/2000, Command Stations and keyboard versions. prodatum is free software.

Proteum is a free Windows software editor for Proteus and Command Stations.

== OS updates ==
Since Creative withdrew their provision of historical OS updates and manuals for most of the older E-Mu gear sometime around August 2011, many of these files have been made available elsewhere, such as Synth Gear Docs Archive and the E-Mu Legacy Archive.

== Notable users ==
- Mike O'Donnell & Junior Campbell used various Proteus sound modules in the musical score of series 3-7 on Thomas & Friends, most notably Proteus 2.
- Mark Snow used the Whistl'n Joe instrument patch (Patch #125 on the Proteus 2) for The X-Files theme.
- Robyn Miller used an MPS Plus Orchestral as the sole instrument when composing the soundtrack to Myst.
- Eric Serra used the Infinite One instrument patch to get the sharp, metallic percussive sound that is featured in his soundtracks, such as in The Fifth Element, Leon the Professional, and GoldenEye. Subsequently, the video game composer Graeme Norgate would use the same patch in games such as GoldenEye 007 and Perfect Dark. The sound originally is from a tambourine, pitched down, and treated with delay and reverb effects.
- John Linnell of American alternative rock band They Might Be Giants used the Proteus FX and Proteus 2000 between the mid-1990s and mid-2000s.
- A major amount of sounds from Proteus 2000 can be heard in KikoRiki soundtrack, specifically in "Chase Theme", "Off You Go!" or as individual sound effects.
