= E-mu Audity =

Analog synthesizer

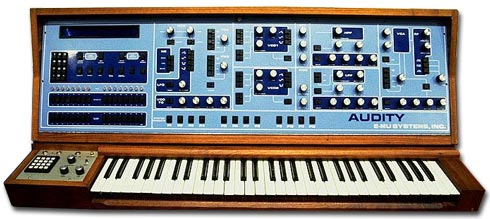
E-mu Audity

The E-mu Audity was a digitally controlled, analog synthesizer made in 1978. It was inspired by Tangerine Dream's Peter Baumann, and eventually evolved into a state-of-the-art, 16-voice polyphonic analog synthesizer with an included digital keyboard and sequencer that was intended to compete with Sequential Circuits' Prophet 5. The project was funded with royalties from Sequential Circuits for their use of E-mu's digital scanning technology in their keyboards, and was to be sold for $69,200 (approximately $199,000, when adjusted for inflation in 2016).

Only one Audity was ever built. It was exhibited at the May 1980 AES convention, but soon after Sequential Circuits notified E-mu that it was not going to continue paying royalties, which ensured the Audity's death. However, research on the Audity led to the development of the influential and successful Emulator, one of the first digital sampling keyboards.

The only Audity ever made resides in the collection of National Music Centre at Studio Bell in Calgary. It no longer functions.
