= Digital Sound Factory =

Sound design-company founded by Timothy Swartz in 2007

Digital Sound Factory is a sound design company that creates sound libraries, known as SoundFont libraries, for playback on synthesizers and computers compatible with Steinberg Cubase, Cakewalk Sonar, Reasonstudios, Steinberg Halion, Native Instruments Kontakt, Apple GarageBand, Apple Logic, Ableton Live, GenieSoft Overture, Finale, Creative Labs Audigy/X-Fi, E-MU Systems EmulatorX/Proteus X, LMMS, FL Studio, MuseScore, Mixcraft, VSamp, SFZ, SynthFont, Ardour, FluidSynth and more.

== History ==
Digital Sound Factory was founded by Timothy Swartz in 2007 and employs musicians and performs detailed recordings of their instruments. The recordings are processed using digital signal processors and mapped to a MIDI piano keyboard. Modern music, television, movies, and advertisements are composed using these sounds by electronic musicians Using software synthesizers, composers can have a large collection of sound content on command. Since 1971 the sound libraries at E-mu Systems were recorded into samples designed to play back audio on physical hardware. Digital Sound Factory has an exclusive license with E-mu to re-master the primary source libraries to function on modern computer formats. Digital Sound Factory's first releases include the E-mu Systems Proteus and Emulator sounds, the Ensoniq ASR/EPS/TS sounds, and brand new sound libraries recorded recently independent of the E-MU sound library.

Digital Sound Factory's content is integrated with:

Cakewalk

Creative Labs

E-MU Systems

Line 6

PreSonus

Propellerhead Software

Yamaha Music Corporation

== Timeline of major products ==
- 2007 - Digital Sound Factory releases E-MU Systems' original Proteus trilogy (directly from the Protozoa ROM expansions from Proteus 2000) and Emulator SoundFont libraries
- 2008 - Digital Sound Factory releases E-MU Cakewalk Proteus Pack (Proteus 2000, Mo’ Phatt, Virtuoso, Planet Earth, Xtreme Lead-1, & PX-7 Drums)
- 2008 - Digital Sound Factory releases Propellerhead Reason Refills
- 2009 - Digital Sound Factory releases Yamaha Motif World XSpedition, XStrings, Vocal XSpressions, & Steinway Grand libraries
- 2010 - Digital Sound Factory releases Cakewalk company Dimension SFZ Instrument volumes 1 -13. Includes Grand Piano, Vinatage Synthesizers, World Instruments, Guitars, Basses, Drums, Orchestral, Hip Hop, and more.
- 2011 - Digital Sound Factory releases Cakewalk company Rapture Sound Expansion volumes. Includes Analog Digital Synth Resources, Dance Tools, Film Score, and Synthesizer Rage.
- 2012 - Digital Sound Factory releases Cakewalk company Z3TA+2 Sound Expansions. Includes Digital Keys, Fashion Leads, Ultraspheres, Wave Scapes, & Xtreme Synth Basses.
- 2012 - Digital Sound Factory releases Native Instruments Kontakt Sound Expansions. Featured products are the E-MU Systems Proteus Pack, Ensoniq ASR, Performance Synthesizers, Yamaha Concert Grand Pianos, and Steinway Grand Piano.
- 2013 - Digital Sound Factory endorsed by Mason & Hamlin Piano company to sample and reproduce the CC 9'2" Concert Grand Piano in digital format.
- 2014 - Digital Sound Factory releases Cakewalk company Sound Center Sound Expansions for Valve Steam. Expansions include; Video Game Sound Designer, Steinway Grand, Vintage Keyboards, World Instruments, Guitars, Basses, Orchestral Strings, Orchestral Winds/Brass/Percussion, Modern Strings, Urban, Electronica, B-3, Rhodes EP, Wurlitzer EP, Yamaha CP70, Prophet 600, OB-Xa, Clavinet, Mellotron, and Sound Effects.
- 2019 - Digital Sound Factory releases EMU Systems' NI Proteus Rack which includes Proteus 2000, Mo’ Phatt, Virtuoso, Xtreme Lead-1, Planet Earth, and Vintage Pro. Though, not an update of the Proteus Rack. This is built from the ground up and designed for Native Instruments free Kontakt Player, the full version of Kontakt, Komplete, and Maschine. They can all also be controlled with NKS hardware as they are seamlessly integrated.

== See also ==
- Sampler
- Music sequencer
