= E-mu Systems =

American music technology company

E-MU Systems
- Type: Subsidiary
- Industry: Computer software Computer hardware
- Founded: 1971; 55 years ago
- Defunct: 2002
- Fate: Acquired by Creative Technology in 1993 and merged with Ensoniq, now dissolved
- Headquarters: Scotts Valley, California, United States
- Products: DSPs
- Parent: Creative Technology
- Website: www.emu.com

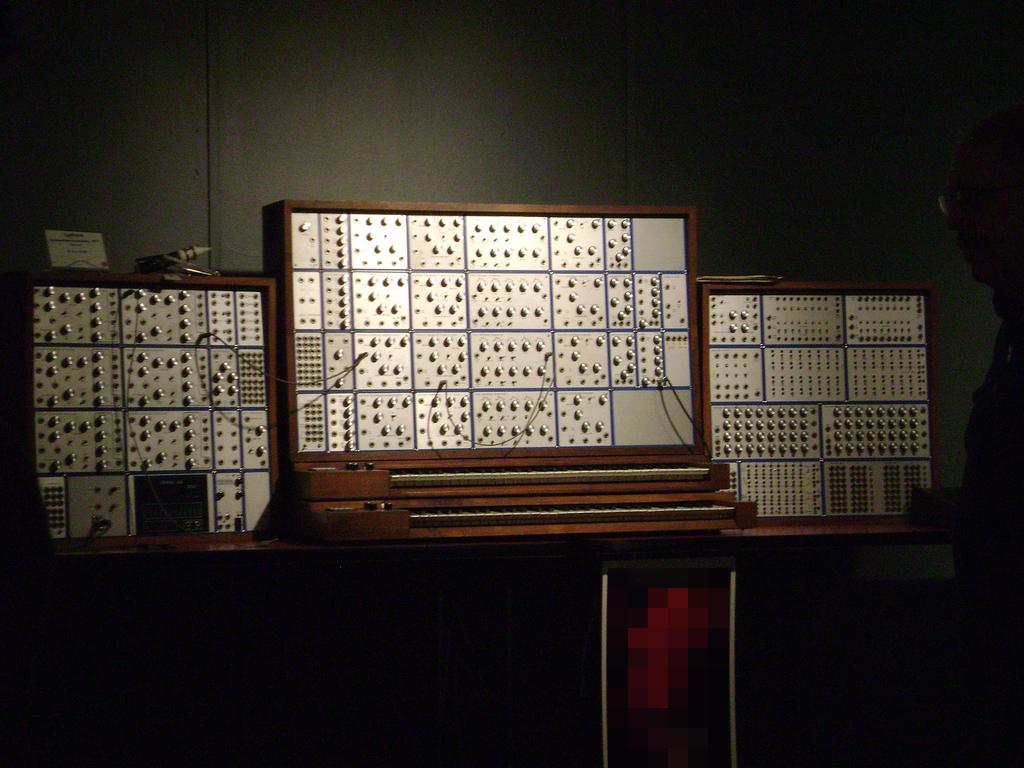
E-mu Modular System

E-mu Systems was a software synthesizer, audio interface, MIDI interface, and MIDI keyboard manufacturer. Founded in 1971 as a synthesizer maker, E-mu was a pioneer in samplers, sample-based drum machines and low-cost digital sampling music workstations.

After its acquisition in 1993, E-mu Systems was a wholly owned subsidiary of Creative Technology, Ltd. In 1998, E-mu was combined with its domestic arch-rival Ensoniq, another synthesizer and sampler manufacturer previously acquired by Creative Technology. E-mu was last based in Scotts Valley, California, on the outskirts of Silicon Valley.

== History ==
E-mu Systems was founded in Santa Cruz, California by Dave Rossum, a UCSC student and two of his friends from Caltech, Steve Gabriel and Jim Ketcham, with the goal to build their own modular synthesizers. Scott Wedge, who would ultimately become president, joined later that summer. In 1972, E-mu became a company, developing and patenting a digitally scanned polyphonic keyboard (1973), licensed for use by Oberheim Electronics in the Oberheim Four Voice and Eight Voice synthesizers and by Dave Smith in the Sequential Circuits Prophet-5. E-mu, along with Solid State Micro Technology (SSM), also developed several synthesizer module IC chips, that were used by both E-mu and many other synthesizer companies.

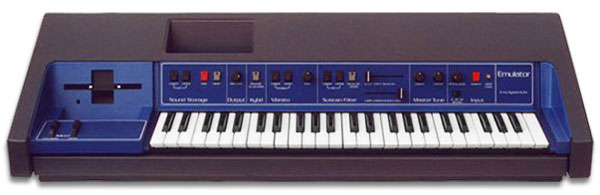
The Emulator I (1982)

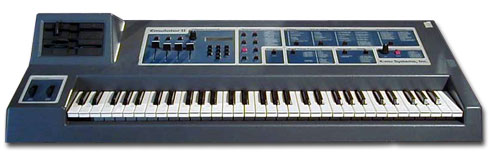
E-mu Emulator II (1984)

With the financial benefit of the royalties that came from working with these other synthesizer manufacturers, E-mu designed the Audity, their first non-modular synthesizer, showing it at the 1980 AES Convention. With a price of $69,200 (over $200,000 in 2009 terms when adjusted for inflation), only one machine was ever produced. At that same convention, Wedge and Rossum saw the Fairlight CMI and the Linn LM-1. Recognizing the trend of digital samplers, they realized that E-mu had the technology to bring a lower-priced sampler to market. The Emulator debuted in 1981 at a list price of $7,900, significantly less than the $30,000 Fairlight. Following the Emulator, E-mu released the first programmable drum machine with samples built-in priced below $1,000, the E-mu Drumulator. The Drumulator's success was followed by the Emulator II and III, the SP-12 drum sampler, and the Emax series of samplers.

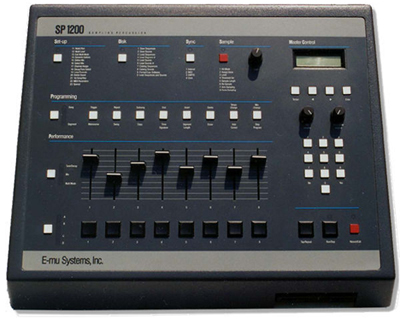
E-mu SP-1200

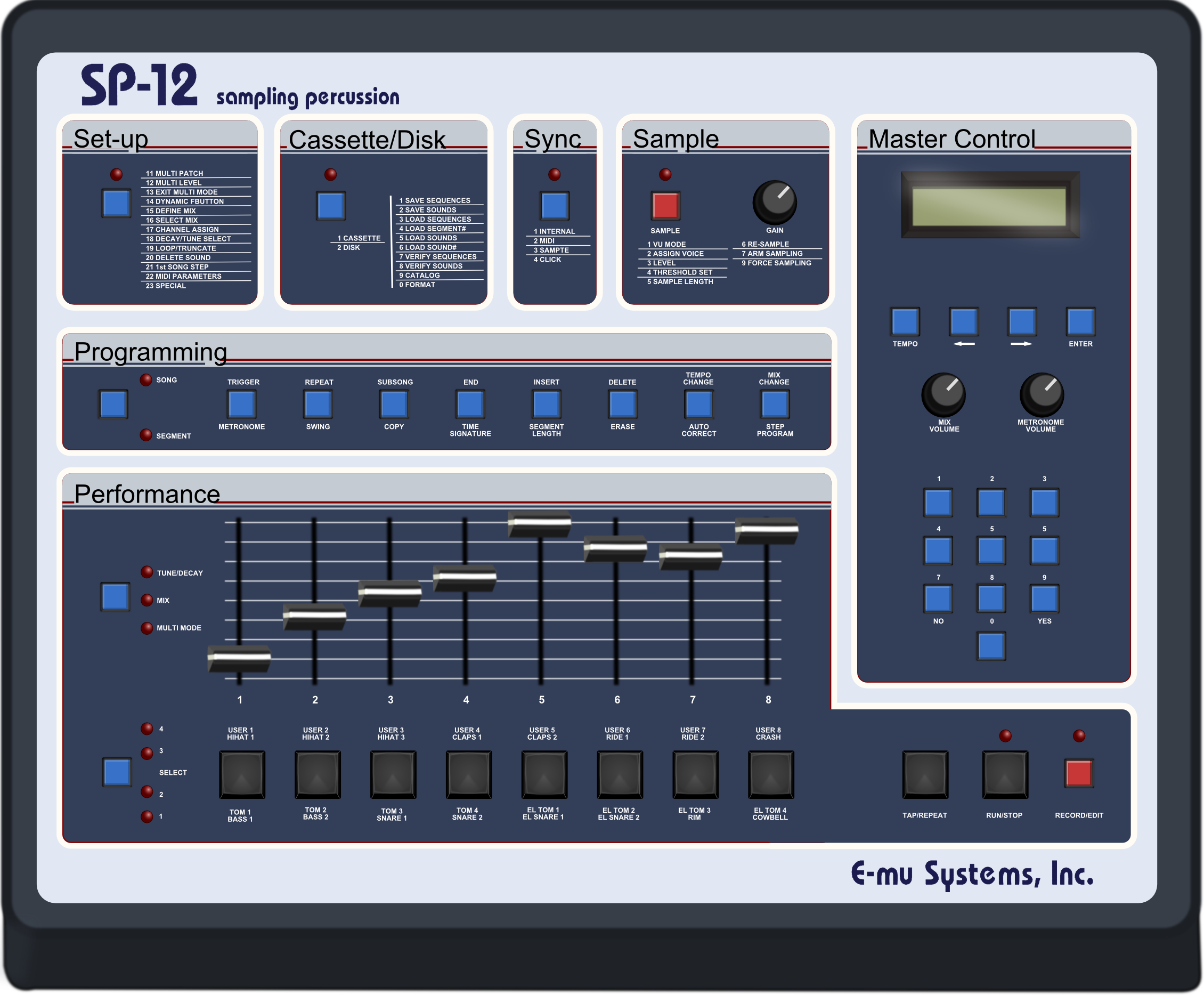
E-mu SP-12

In 1990, E-mu introduced the Proteus, a rackmount sound module, containing pre-recorded samples in ROM. At its introduction, the Proteus had a relatively large library of high-quality samples priced much lower than the competition. The success of the Proteus spurred the development of several additional versions, including the Proteus XR, an orchestral version, and a world music version. In 1987, E-mu's SP-1200 drum sampler offered an "all-in-one" box for sequencing not only drum sounds, but looping samples, and it quickly became the instrument of choice for hip hop producers.

In 1993, E-mu was acquired by Creative Technology (the Singaporean parent company of Creative Labs) and began working on PC sound card synthesis. Creative Wave Blaster II and Sound Blaster AWE32 used EMU8000 effect processor.

In 1996, E-mu attempted to break into the digital multi-track market with the Darwin 8-track hard disk recording system. Meanwhile, E-mu continued to develop electronic musical instruments, and in 1996, began introducing another series of 32-voice polyphonic, 16-part multitimbral sound modules along the lines of the Proteus series, each loaded with preset sounds designed for a specific music genre, and packaged in a 1-space rackmount unit. The first of these was the electronic electronic dance music-oriented Orbit. In 1997, the hip hop and trip hop-oriented Planet Phatt and the latin music-oriented Carnaval were introduced.

In 1998, E-mu was combined with its former arch-rival Ensoniq, another synthesizer and sampler manufacturer previously acquired by Creative Technology.

In 2001 E-mu's sound modules were repackaged in the form of the XL7 and MP7 Command Stations, a line of tabletop music workstations, each featuring 128-voice polyphony, advanced synthesis features, and a versatile multitrack sequencer. A complementary line of keyboard synthesizers was also released using the same technology.

Subsequent products from E-mu were exclusively in software form. In 2004 E-mu released the Emulator X, a PC-based version of its hardware samplers with extended synthesis capabilities. While a PCI card is used for audio input and output, the algorithms no longer run on dedicated hardware but in software on the PC. Proteus X, a software-based sample player, was released in 2005.

== Non-Creative sound cards ==
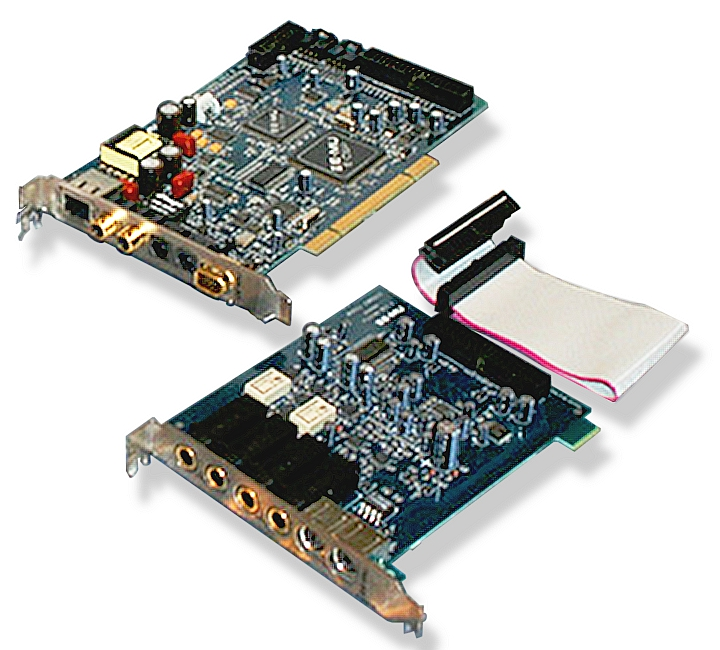
E-mu 1212m PCI
Digital Audio System

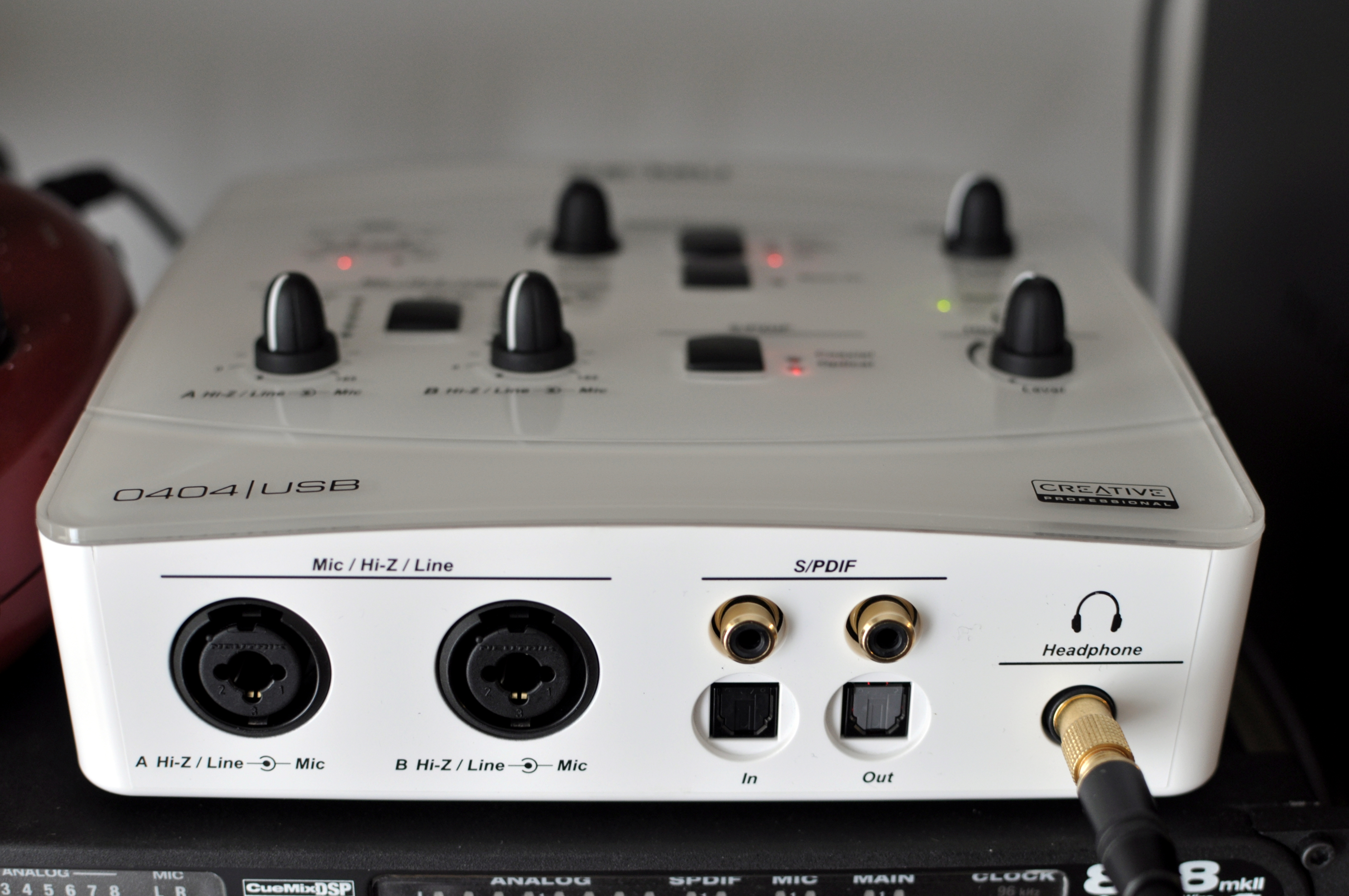
E-mu 0404 USB 2.0 White

During 2003-2007, E-mu designed and published a series of high-fidelity "Digital Audio Systems" (computer sound cards), intended for professional, semi-professional and computer audio enthusiast use. They were released under the name E-MU, however bearing a "Creative Professional" label. The card names are number-coded for the number of physical inputs and outputs: 0404, 1212m, 1616, 1616m, 1820 and 1820m, where 1616 is a CardBus version and the rest for PCI, while "m" denotes extra high-quality analogue outputs and inputs. The 1820m was touted as the series' flagship product until the 1616 and 1616M were released (A PCI version of the 1616/M later followed). All of the cards had drivers for Microsoft Windows 2000 and later versions that were current at time of the respective products' release. (32- and 64-bit). Only a beta version driver was released for Windows 7. Apple Macintosh support appeared to be pending, but may have been affected by Apple's migration towards Intel.

While the core DSP chip (EMU10K2) of the cards is the same one designed by E-MU and used in Creative's Sound Blaster Audigy2 cards (and hence capable of 24-bit 192 kHz PCM sound), official press releases for the E-MU sound cards have emphasized Creative's lack of input on the design, and the in-house development of the cards and drivers — that is, they wanted to distinguish their "own" series from Creative's signature Sound Blasters. Notably, the cards and drivers entirely omit internal 'wavetable' sample-based MIDI synthesis, Creative's proprietary EAX sound routines and basically anything commonly associated with the parent company. Although the cards were rushed into market and originally came bundled with fairly raw drivers (which have subsequently received periodical major improvements and even additions beyond the advertised specifications), they have generally met with rather favourable reviews.

== Timeline of major products ==
1979 - Audity
1982 - Emulator
1984 - Emulator II
1985 - SP-12
1987 - SP-1200
1987 - Emulator III
1988 - Emax SE
1989 - Proteus 1 (Pop/Rock)
1993 - Emulator IIIXP
1994 - ProteusFX
1997 - Planet Phatt (Hip-Hop); 1996 - Orbit (Techno/Electronica)
1996 - Launch-Pad controller for Orbit
1998 - E-mu Proteus 2000
1999 - E4XT Ultra
2000 - Xtreme Lead-1 (Techno/Electronica); 2000 - Mo'Phatt (Hip-Hop); 2002 - Turbo Phatt (Hip-Hop)
2001 - E-mu PK-6 (Pop/Rock)

- 1973 - E-mu Modular System
- 1980 - Audity
- 1981 - Emulator
- 1983 - Drumulator
- 1984 - Emulator II
- 1985 - E-mu SP-12
- 1986 - Emax
- 1987 - Emulator III
- 1987 - E-mu SP-1200
- 1989 - E-mu Emax2
- 1989 - Proteus 1 Pop/Rock
- 1990 - Proteus 2 Orchestral
- 1991 - Proteus 3 World
- 1991 - Pro/Cussion
- 1993 - Morpheus
- 1994 - Emulator IV / e 64
- 1996 - Orbit 9090
- 1997 - Planet Phatt
- 1997 - Carnaval
- 1997 - Orbit 9090 V2
- 1998 - E-mu APS (Audio Production Studio)
- 1999 - E4 Ultra Samplers
- 1999 - Proteus 2000
- 2001 - XL7/MP7 Command Stations
- 2003 - PCI Digital Audio Systems
- 2004 - Emulator X
- 2005 - CardBus Digital Audio Systems
- 2006 - Emulator X2
- 2006 - Xboard 25, 49, 61
- 2006 - E-mu Proteus X
- 2007 - Digital Sound Factory licenses and remasters original Proteus and Emulator sound libraries
- 2009 - E-mu PIPEline Digital Wireless Transmitter and Receiver System
- 2009 - Emulator X3, the final incarnation of E-MU's flagship software sampler
- 2010 - longboard 61, shortboard 49 wireless performance keyboards

== See also ==
- Dave Rossum
- Digital Sound Factory (company)
- Oberheim Electronics
- Polyphony (instrument)
- Sampler
- Sequential Circuits
