= Polyphony and monophony in instruments =

Property of musical instruments

Technical specifications
- Polyphony: 1-128

Input/output

Polyphony is a property of musical instruments that means that they can play multiple independent melody lines simultaneously. Instruments featuring polyphony are said to be polyphonic. Instruments that are not capable of polyphony are monophonic or paraphonic.

An intuitively understandable example for a polyphonic instrument is a (classical) piano, on which the player plays different melody lines with the left and the right hand - depending on music style and composition, these may be musically tightly interrelated or may even be totally unrelated to each other, like in parts of Jazz music. An example for monophonic instruments is a trumpet which can generate only one tone (frequency) at a time, except when played by extraordinary musicians.

== Synthesizer ==
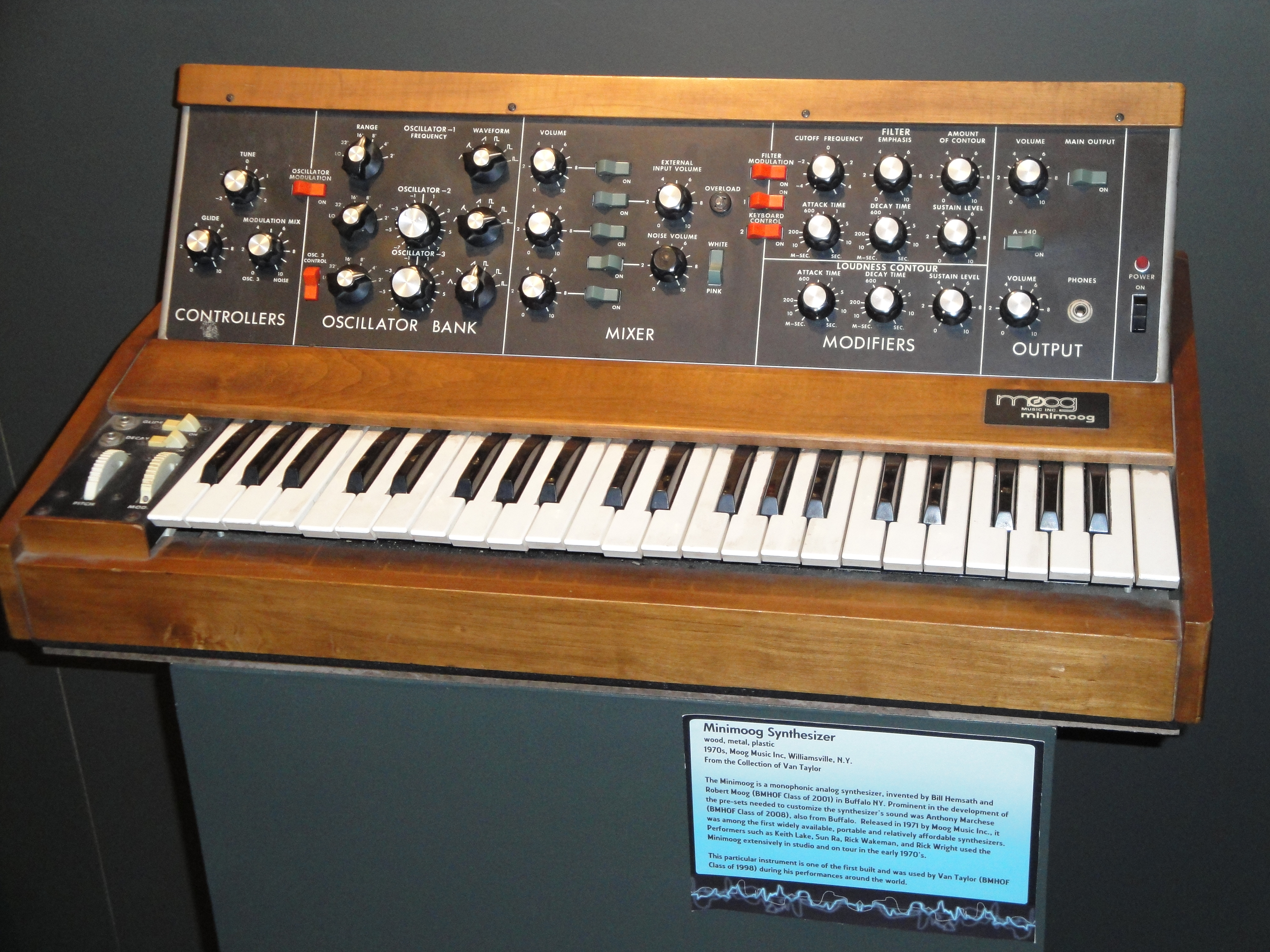
Typical monophonic synthesizer:
Moog Minimoog

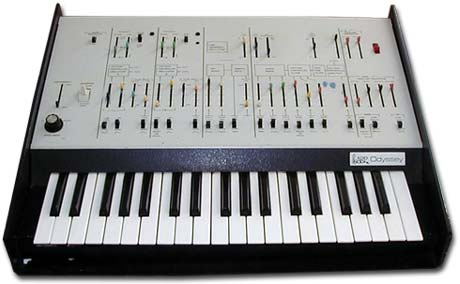
Typical duophonic synthesizer:
ARP Odyssey

=== Monophonic ===
A monophonic synthesizer or monosynth is a synthesizer that produces only one note at a time, making it smaller and cheaper than a polyphonic synthesizer which can play multiple notes at once. This does not necessarily refer to a synthesizer with a single oscillator; the Minimoog, for example, has three oscillators which are settable in arbitrary intervals, but it can play only one note at a time.

Well-known monosynths include the Minimoog, the Roland TB-303, the Korg Prophecy, and the Korg Monologue.

=== Duophonic ===
Duophonic synthesizers, such as the ARP Odyssey and Formanta Polivoks built in the 1970s and 1980s respectively, have a capability to independently play two pitches at a time. These synthesizers have at least two oscillators that are separately controllable, and a duophonic keyboard that can generate two control voltage signals for the lowest- and highest-note. When two or more keys are pressed simultaneously, the lowest- and highest-note will be heard. When only one key is pressed, both oscillators are assigned to one note, possibly with a more complex sound.

=== Paraphonic ===
Paraphonic synthesizers, such as the Solina String Ensemble or Korg Poly-800, were designed to play multiple pitches at the same time by using multiple oscillators, but with a common filter and/or amplifier circuit shared among all the voices. The result is a synthesizer that can play chords, provided all the notes start and end at the same time (homophony). For example, playing a new note on top of notes already held might retrigger the volume envelope for the entire sound. Monophonic synthesizers with more than one oscillator (such as the ARP 2600) can often be patched to behave in a paraphonic manner, allowing for each oscillator to play an independent pitch which is then routed through a common VCF and VCA.

=== Polyphonic ===
The earliest polyphonic synthesizers were built in the late-1930s, but the concept did not become popular until the mid-1970s. Harald Bode's Warbo Formant Orguel, developed in 1937, was an archetype of a voice allocation polyphonic synthesizer. Novachord by Hammond Organ Company, released in 1939, is a forefather product of frequency divider organs and polyphonic synthesizer. It uses octave divider technology to generate polyphony, and about 1,000 Novachords were manufactured until 1942.

==== Synths using octave divider ====
Using an octave divider a synthesizer needs only 12 oscillators – one for each note in the musical scale. The additional notes are generated by dividing down the outputs of these oscillators. To produce a note one octave lower, the frequency of the oscillator is divided by two. Polyphony is achieved so long as only one of each note in the scale is played simultaneously.

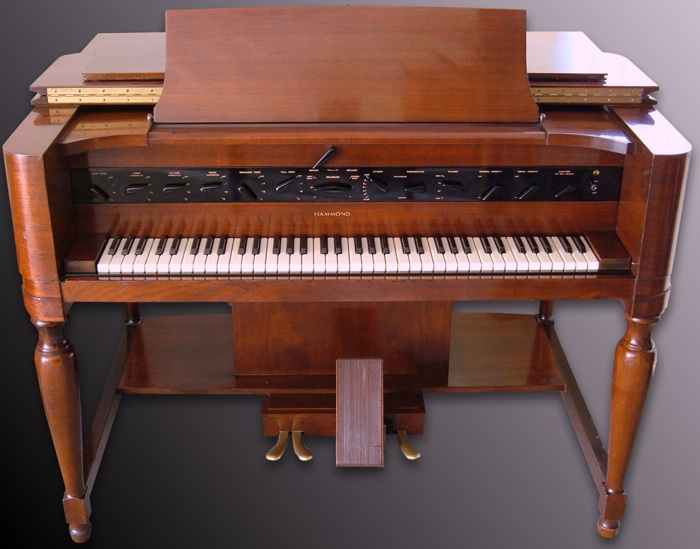
Hammond Novachord (1939)

A forefather of octave divider synth and electronic organs.

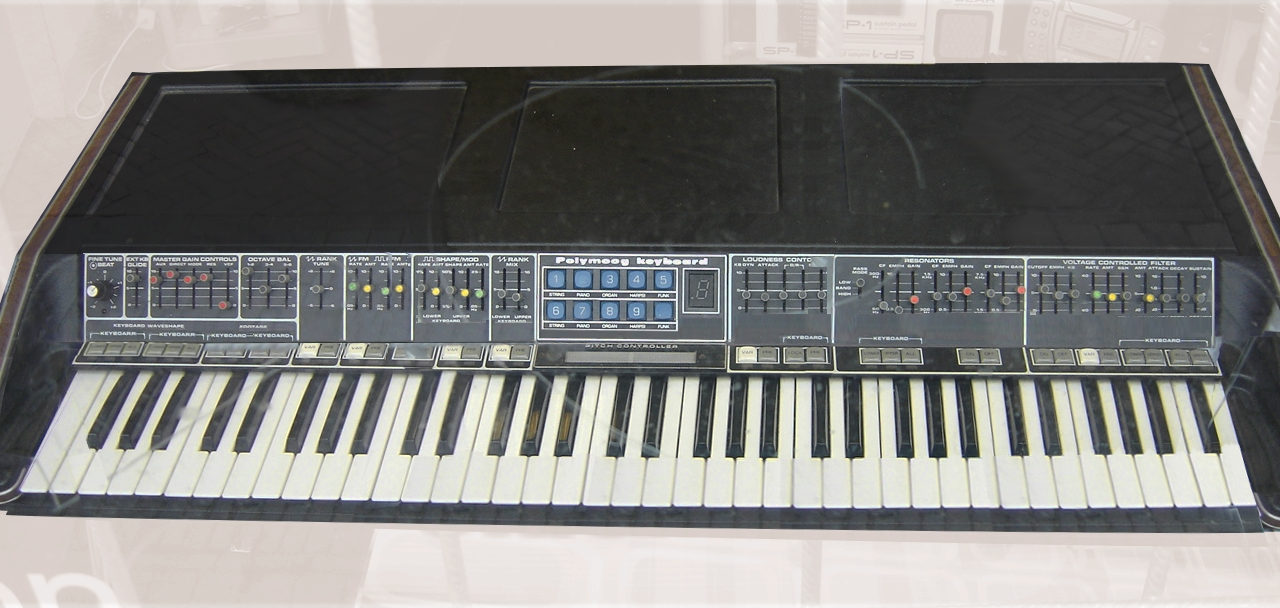
Moog Polymoog (1975)

Octave divider technology similar to Novachord was used.

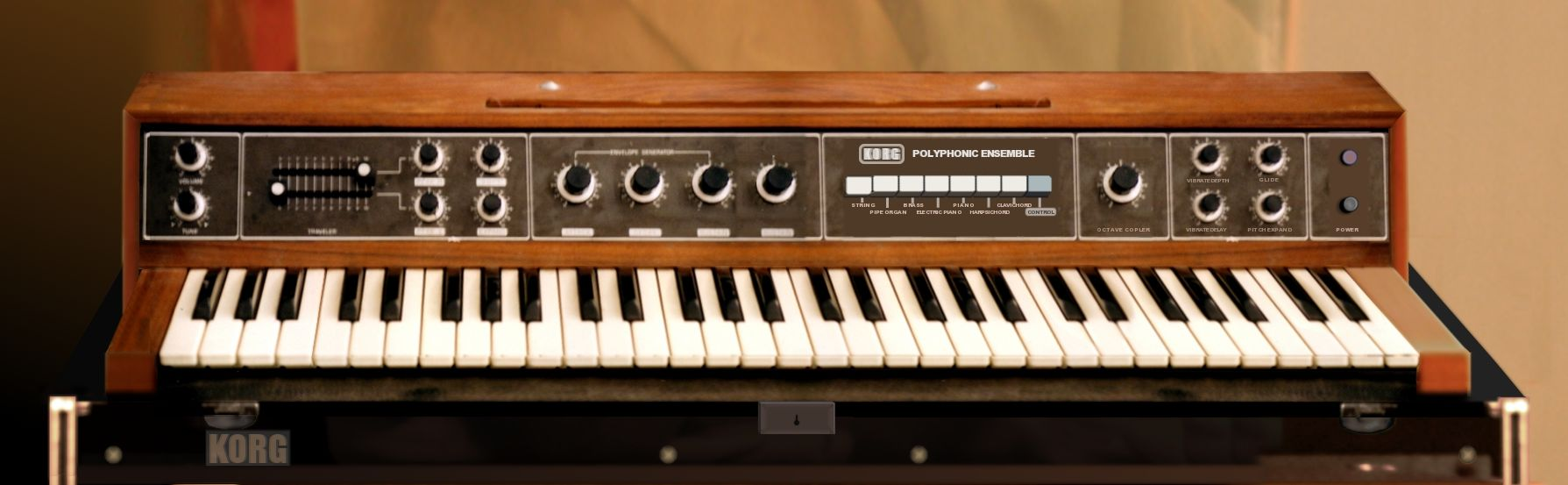
Korg PE-1000 (1976)

Polyphonic ensemble keyboard consists with one synth per key (totally 60 synthesizers), based on octave divider

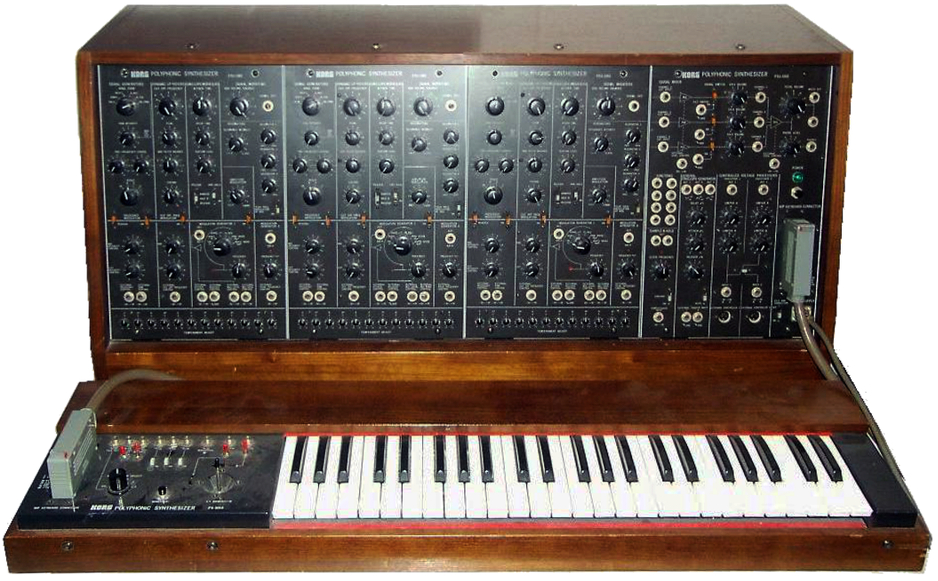
Korg PS-3300 (1977)

Patchable polyphonic synthesizer consists with three synths per key (totally 144 synthesizers), based on octave divider.

==== Synths using voice allocation ====
In the early-to-mid-1970s, the voice allocation technology with digital keyboard scanning was independently developed by several engineers and musical instrument manufacturers, including Yamaha, E-mu Systems, and Armand Pascetta (Electro Group). The Oberheim Polyphonic Synthesizer and Sequential Circuits Prophet-5 were both developed in collaboration with Dave Rossum of E-mu Systems.

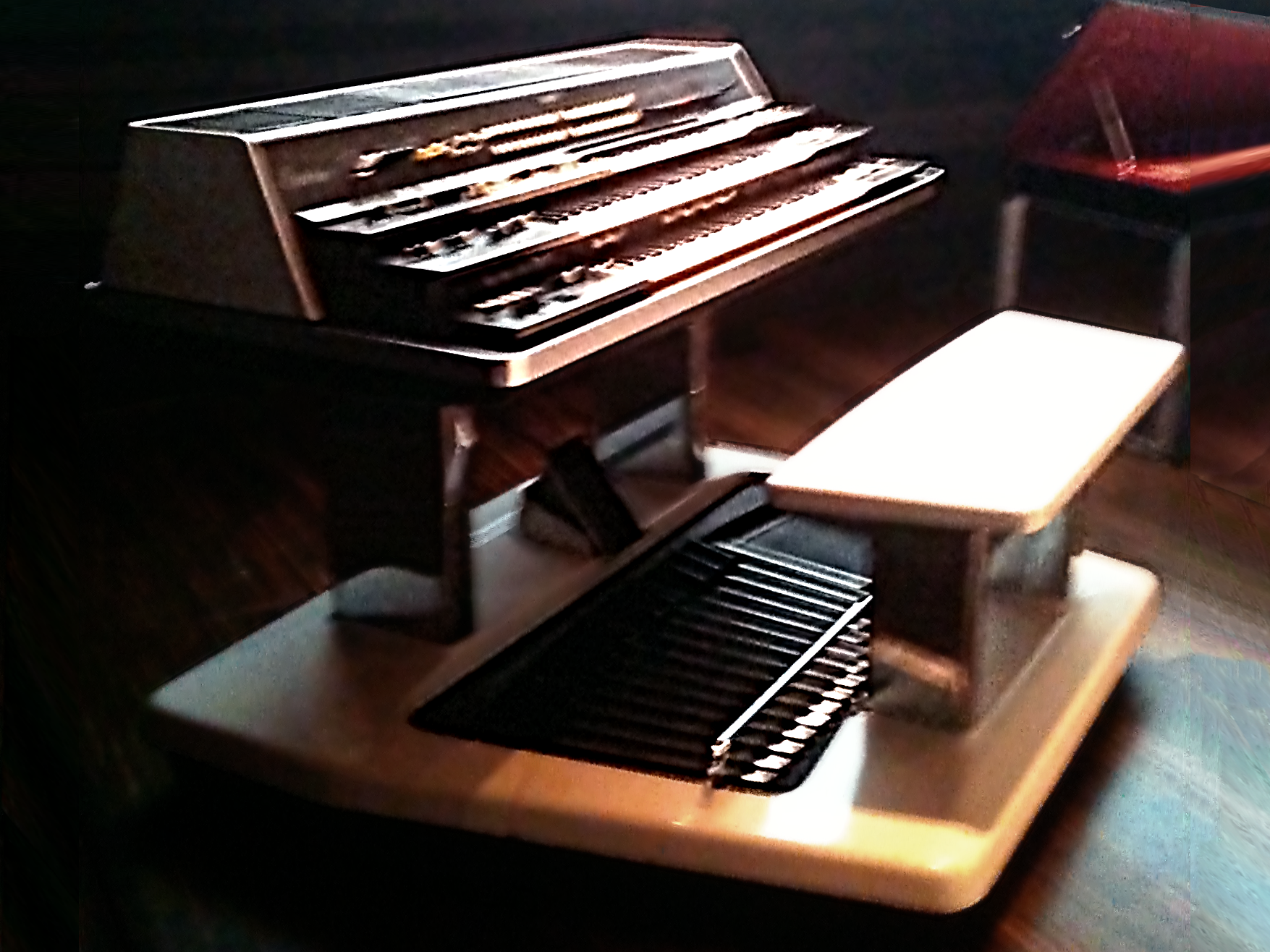
Yamaha GX-1 (1973/1975)

Voice allocation technology was used to assign the limited 8-voices per manual into the notes. It was succeeded by the portable Yamaha CS-80 (1976), which was successful and became one of the most popular polyphonic analog synths.

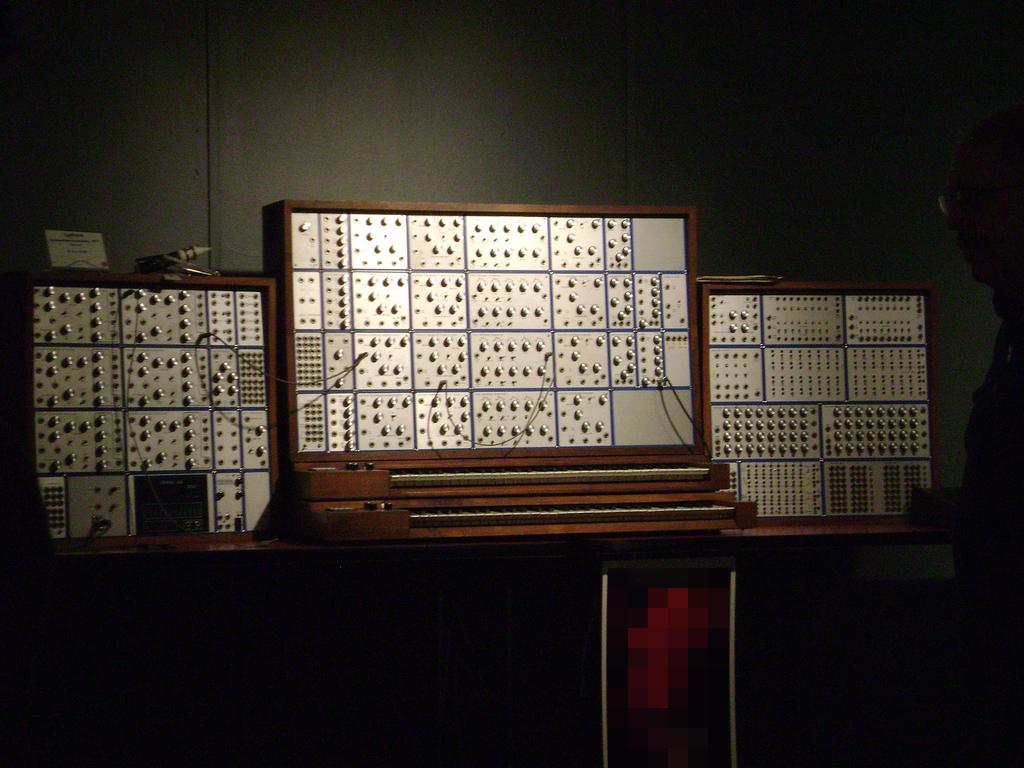
E-mu Modular System (1974)

In 1974, Dave Rossum and E-mu developed the polyphonic technologies, and in 1977, released the 4060 Polyphonic Keyboard and Sequencer.

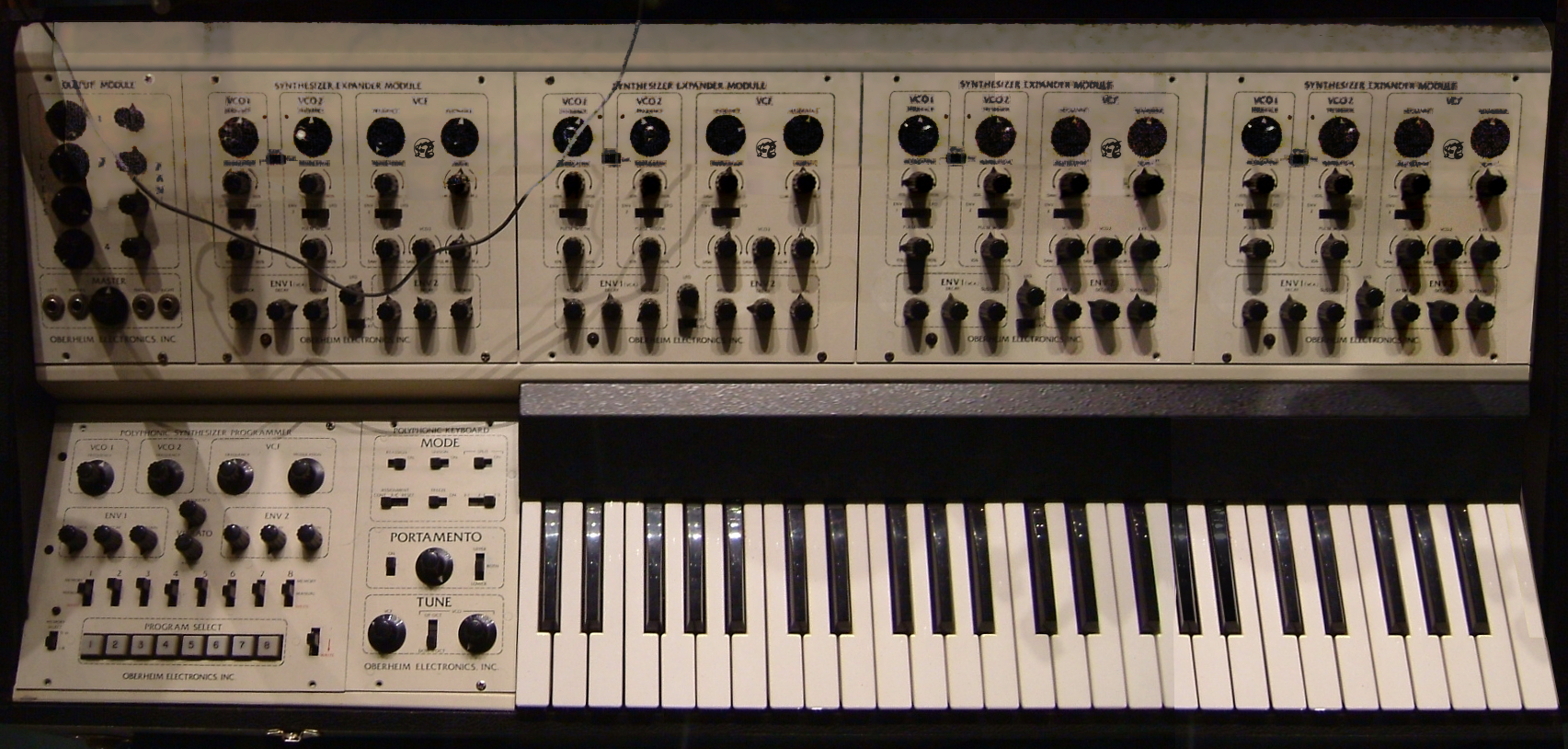
Oberheim Four Voice (FVS-1) (1975)

It was developed under the collaboration with E-mu Systems.

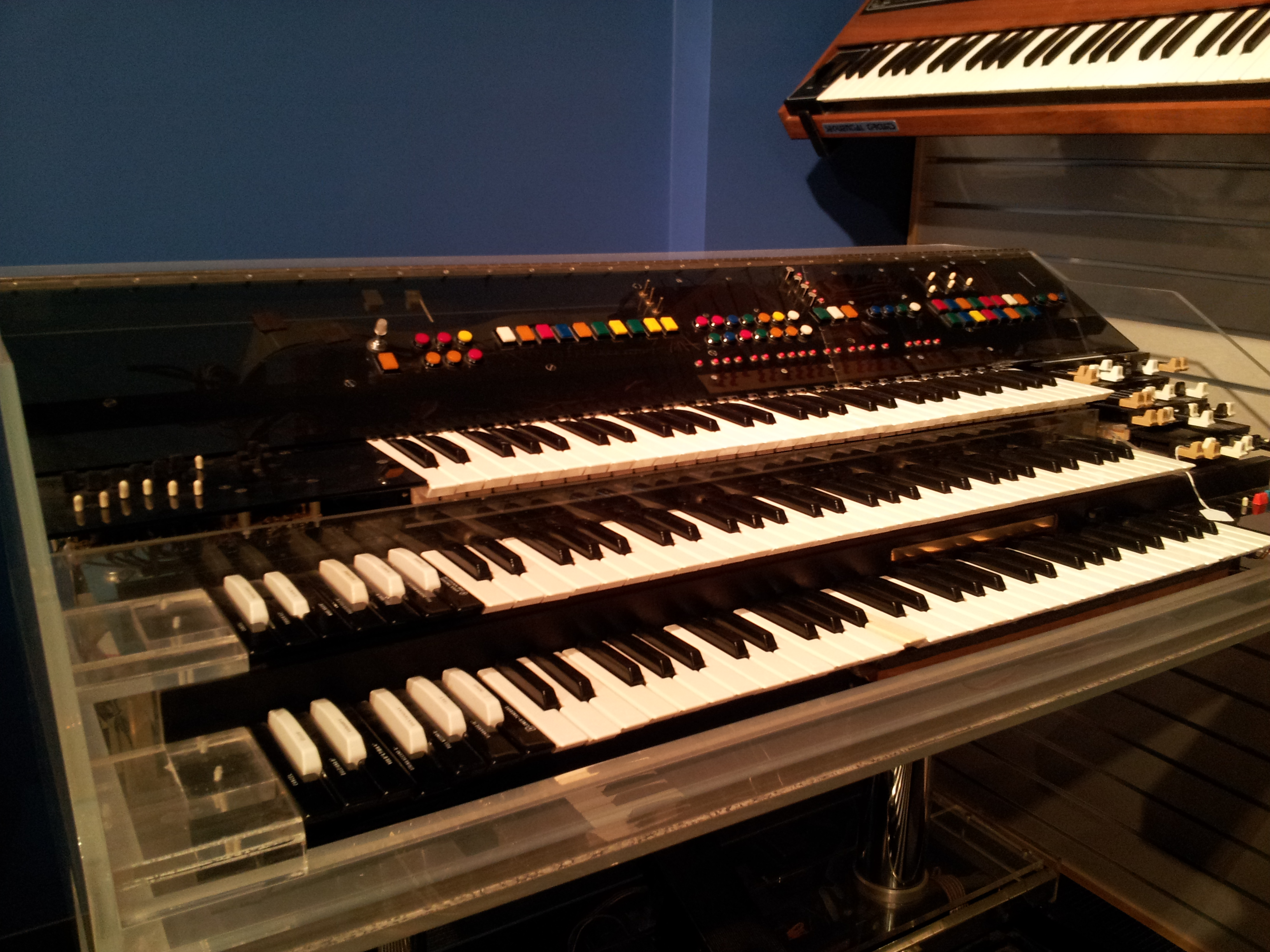
Live Electronic Orchestra (LEO)
by Don Lewis (1977)

LEO used Armand Pascetta's polyphonic keyboard (c. 1975) to control the multiple synthesizers.

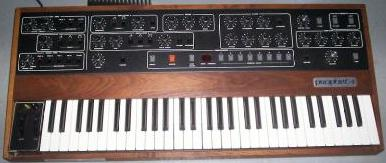
Sequential Circuits Prophet-5 (1978)

One of the most popular polyphonic synth featuring patch memories, also used E-mu's technology.

=== Number of voices ===
One notable early polyphonic synthesizer, the Prophet 5 released in 1978, had five-voice polyphony. Another notable polyphonic synth, the Yamaha CS-80 released in 1976, had eight-voice polyphony, as did the Yamaha GX-1 with total 18 voice polyphony, released in 1973. Six-voice polyphony was standard by the mid-1980s. With the advent of digital synthesizers, 16-voice polyphony became standard by the late 1980s. 64-voice polyphony was common by the mid-1990s and 128-note polyphony arrived shortly after. There are several reasons for providing such large numbers of simultaneous notes:

- Even with only ten fingers, it is possible to play more than ten notes at once. Notes may continue to sound even after a key is released. The synthesizer's resources may still be in use to produce the sound of the previously struck notes tapering off, especially when a sustain pedal is used.
- A "sound" (also called a "timbre" or "patch") may be generated by more than one oscillator or sound-source to allow more complicated sounds to be produced. A synthesizer with 16 oscillators may be capable of 16-note polyphony only when simple, single-oscillator sounds are produced. If a particular patch requires four oscillators, then the synthesizer is only capable of four-note polyphony.
- Synthesizers may be configured to produce multiple timbres (multitimbral), particularly necessary when sounds are layered or sequenced. Multitimbral instruments are always polyphonic but polyphonic instruments are not necessarily multitimbral. Some multitimbral instruments have a feature which allows the user to specify the amount of polyphony reserved or allowed for each timbre.

=== Note priority of synthesizer ===
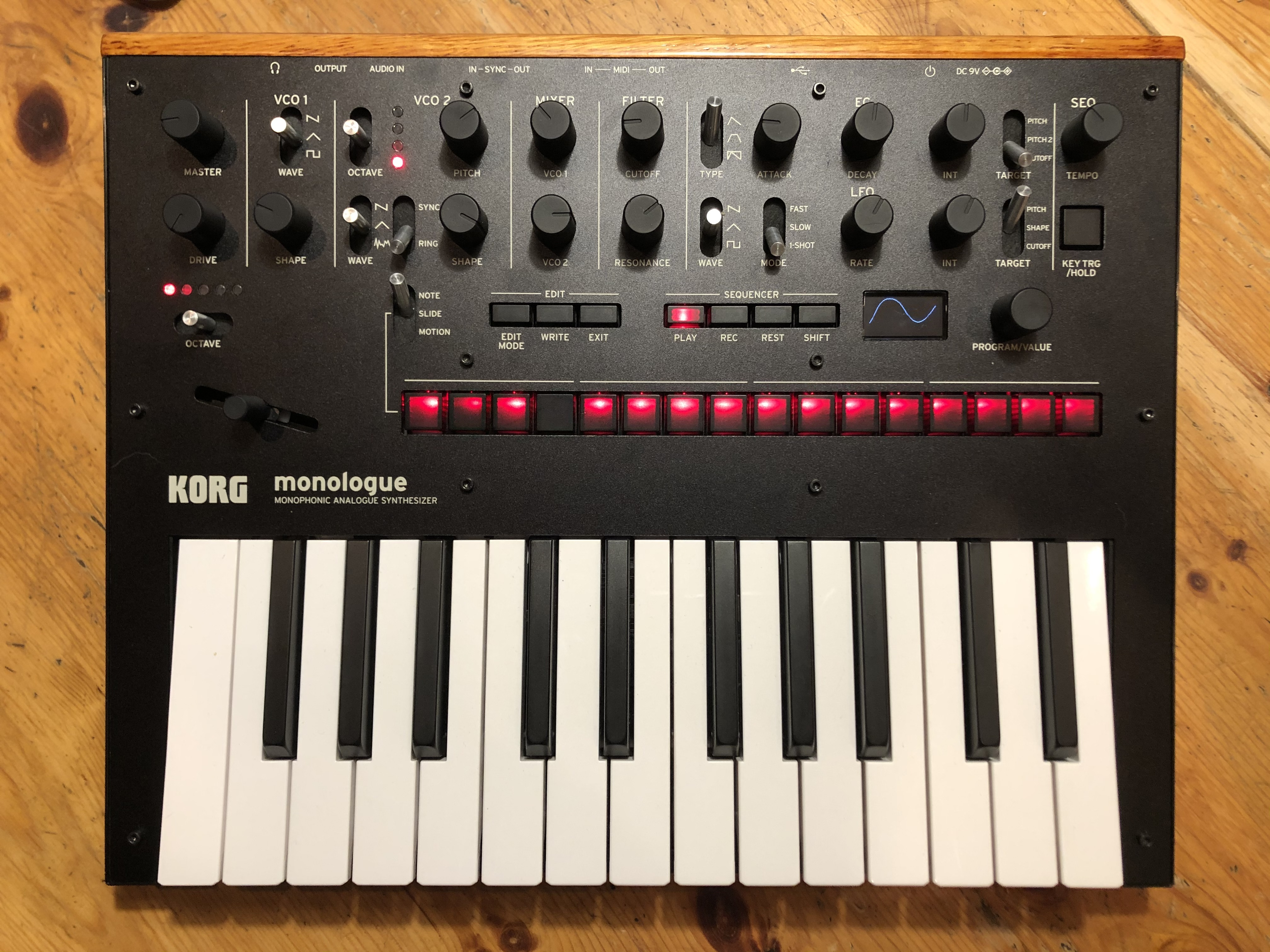
The Korg Monologue is a monophonic synthesizer with two oscillators and programmable note priority.

Synthesizers generally use oscillators to generate the electric signal that forms the basis of the sound, often with a keyboard to trigger the oscillators. However, multiple oscillators working independently are a considerable challenge to implement. To double the polyphony, not only must the number of oscillators be doubled but the electronics must also function as a switch connecting keys to free oscillators instantaneously, implementing an algorithm that decides which notes are turned off if the maximum number of notes is already sounding when an additional key is pressed. There are several ways to implement this:

- Turn off the first note sounded and use the newly freed oscillator to play the new note. With last note priority, priority is based on the order in which keys are played. When new notes are triggered while all voices are playing, the synthesizer frees up polyphony by ending the earliest played sounding note. This is the default mode on most synthesizers.
- Ignore the newly depressed note. With first note priority, earlier notes are not cut off to make room for later ones, and once maximum polyphony has been reached, the person playing the instrument must stop playing one or more notes in order to trigger new ones.
- In highest note priority, new notes that are higher in pitch than ones being already played replace currently playing notes from the lowest on up.
- Lowest note priority works in the same way, but cuts notes from the highest down.

Modern synthesizers and samplers may use additional, multiple, or user-configurable criteria to decide which notes sound.

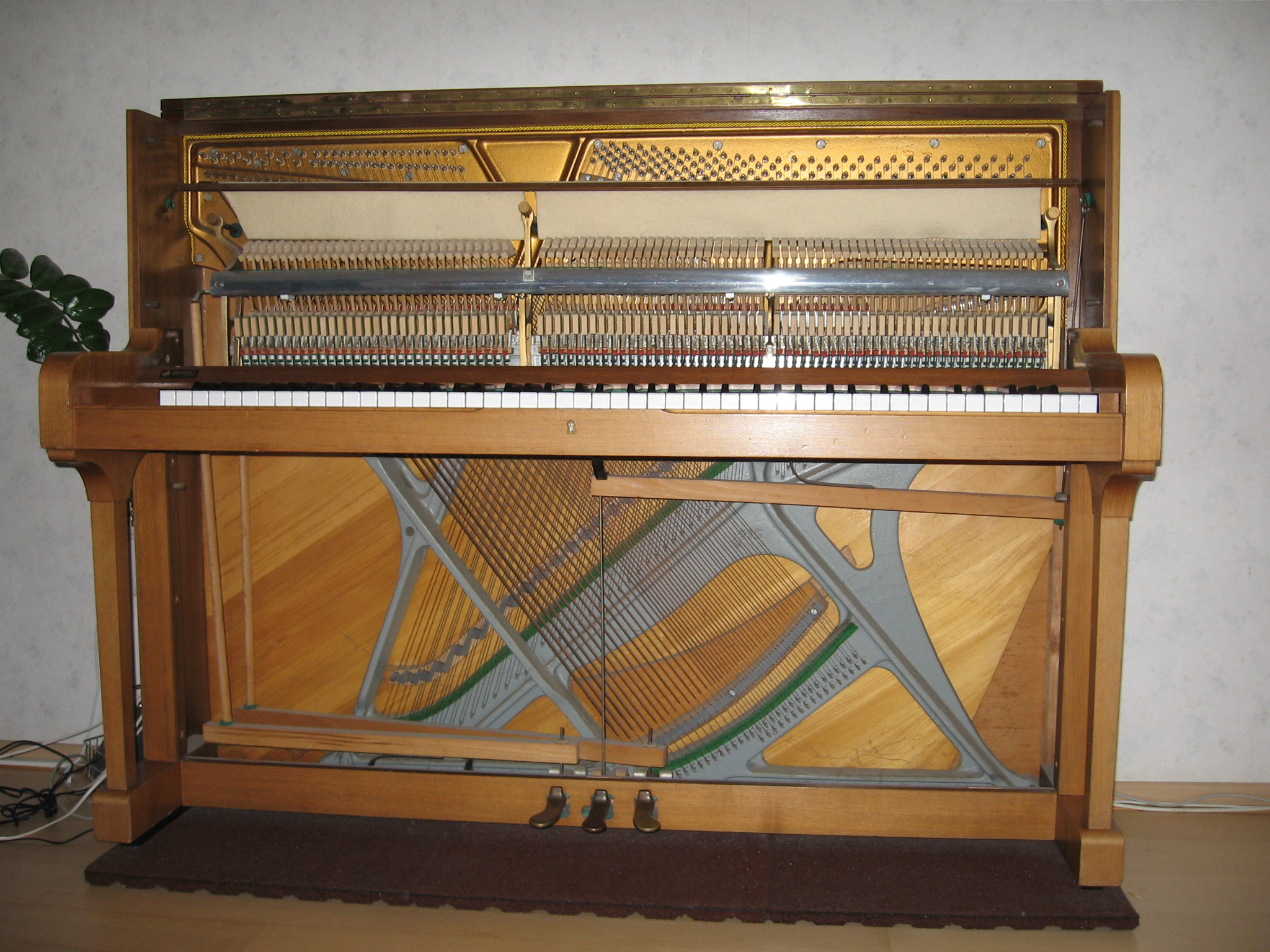
Each key on an acoustic piano is connected to its own hammer-and-string sound-producing mechanism.

== Other instruments ==
=== Keyboard instruments ===
==== Acoustic keyboard instruments ====
Almost all classical keyboard instruments are polyphonic. Examples include the piano, harpsichord, organ and clavichord. These instruments feature a complete sound-generating mechanism for each key in the keybed (e.g., a piano has a string and hammer for every key, and an organ has at least one pipe for each key.) When any key is pressed, the note corresponding to that key will be heard as the mechanism is activated.

Some clavichords do not have a string for each key. Instead, they will have a single string which will be fretted by several different keys. Out of the keys that share a single string, only one may sound at a time.

==== Electric keyboard instruments ====
The electric piano and clavinet rely on the same principles to achieve polyphonic operation. An electric piano has a separate hammer, vibrating metal tine and electrical pickup for each key.

With a few exceptions, electric organs consist of two parts: an audio-generating system and a mixing system. The audio-generating system may be electronic (consisting of oscillators and octave dividers) or it may be electromechanical (consisting of tonewheels and pickups), and it sends a large number of audio outputs to a mixer. The stops or drawbars on the organ modify the signal sent from the audio-generating system, and the keyboard switches the mixer's channels on and off. Those channels which are switched on are heard as notes corresponding to the depressed keys.

=== Stringed instruments ===
==== Classical instruments ====
In classical music, a definition of polyphony does not only mean just playing multiple notes at once but an ability to make audiences perceive multiple lines of independent melodies. Playing multiple notes as a whole, such as a rhythm from a chord pattern, is not polyphony but homophony.

A classical violin has multiple strings and indeed is polyphonic but harder for some beginners to play multiple strings by bowing. One needs to control the pressure, speed and angle well for one note before having an ability to play the multiple notes at acceptable quality expected by the composers.

Therefore, even though the violin family of instruments are misleadingly considered (when bowing) by general untrained musicians to be primarily monophonic, it can be polyphony by both pizzicato (plucking) and bowing techniques for standard trained soloists and orchestra players. The evidence can be seen in compositions since the 17th century such as Bach sonatas and partitas for unaccompanied solo violin.

==== Newer instruments ====
The electric guitar, just like the classical guitar, is polyphonic, as are various guitar derivatives (including the harpejji and the Chapman stick).

=== Wind instruments ===
Multiphonics can be used with many regular wind instruments to produce two or more notes at once, although this is considered an extended technique. Explicitly polyphonic wind instruments are relatively rare, but do exist.

The standard harmonica can easily produce several notes at once.

Multichambered ocarinas are manufactured in a number of varieties, including double, triple, and quadruple ocarinas, which use multiple chambers to extend the ocarina's otherwise limited range, but also enable the musician to play more than one note simultaneously. Harmonic ocarinas are specifically designed for polyphony, and in these instruments the ranges of the chambers usually overlap to some extent (typically at the unison, third, fourth, fifth, seventh or octave). Cross-fingering enables a single chamber to span an entire octave or more.

Recorders can also be doubled for polyphony. There are two types of double recorder; drone and polyphonic. In the drone type, one tube is tuned exactly like a regular recorder with a range of approximately two octaves, and the other tube is a drone and plays the tonic note of the scale. The polyphonic recorder has two tubes with a range of one major sixth. With overblowing, some notes can be played an octave higher, but it is not possible to achieve the range of an entire octave in one tube with these instruments.

Double zhaleikas (a type of hornpipe) also exist, native to southern Russia.

Launeddas are an Italian instrument, native to Sardinia that has both a drone pipe and two pipes capable of polyphony, for a total of three pipes.

== See also ==
- Electronic musical instrument: Polyphony
- Music sequencer
- Paraphony

Formal classification system

- Musical instrument classification
  - Hornbostel–Sachs

== Bibliography ==
- Jenkins, Mark (2007). Analog Synthesizers: Understanding, Performing, Buying: from the Legacy of Moog to Software Synthesis. Taylor & Francis. ISBN 978-0-240-52072-8.
- Keeble, Rob (September 2002). "30 Years of Emu: The History Of Emu Systems". Sound on Sound. Archived from the original on 2015-12-26.
- Lee, Jay (1981). "Interview of Dave Rossum". Polyphony Magazine. No. November/December 1981.
- Vail, Mark (2014). The Synthesizer: A Comprehensive Guide to Understanding, Programming, Playing, and Recording the Ultimate Electronic Music Instrument. OUP USA. ISBN 978-0-19-539489-4.
