= E-mu Proteus X =

E-MU Proteus X is a Virtual Sound Module produced by E-MU Systems that is a software-based audio sample-based synthesis product that includes the complete library soundest of the popular and legacy Proteus 2000 MIDI Module, as well as additional sounds/samples.

Proteus X LE, Proteus VX, Proteus X, Proteus X2, Emulator X, Emulator X2 and Emulator X3 only work on an IBM compatible type PC. While they work for most people on Windows 2000, Windows XP, and Windows Vista 32-bit, all but Emulator X3 are only tested and currently supported for Windows XP. Only Emulator X3 is tested and officially supported for both XP & Vista and is the only version that works as a VSTi in x64 and DAW software.

All versions of the Proteus X Software Sound Module can operate as a stand-alone program with 64-MIDI channels or as a VST instrument with 16-MIDI channels.

Proteus X LE, Proteus X, Proteus X2, Emulator X and Emulator X2 are all copy protected software. User must also have a qualifying E-MU hardware such as a E-MU digital audio interface, E-MU Xmidi 2x2 or E-MU Xboard keyboard controller connected, powered on and installed correctly as the E-MU hardware also acts as a software copy protection dongle for the protected software. Not having all of these things in order often results in the failed launch of the program or the Streaming engine error message. The E-MU Xmidi 1x1 and E-MU Tracker Pre do not function as a copy protection dongle.
