= E-mu Modular System =

Analogue synthesizer

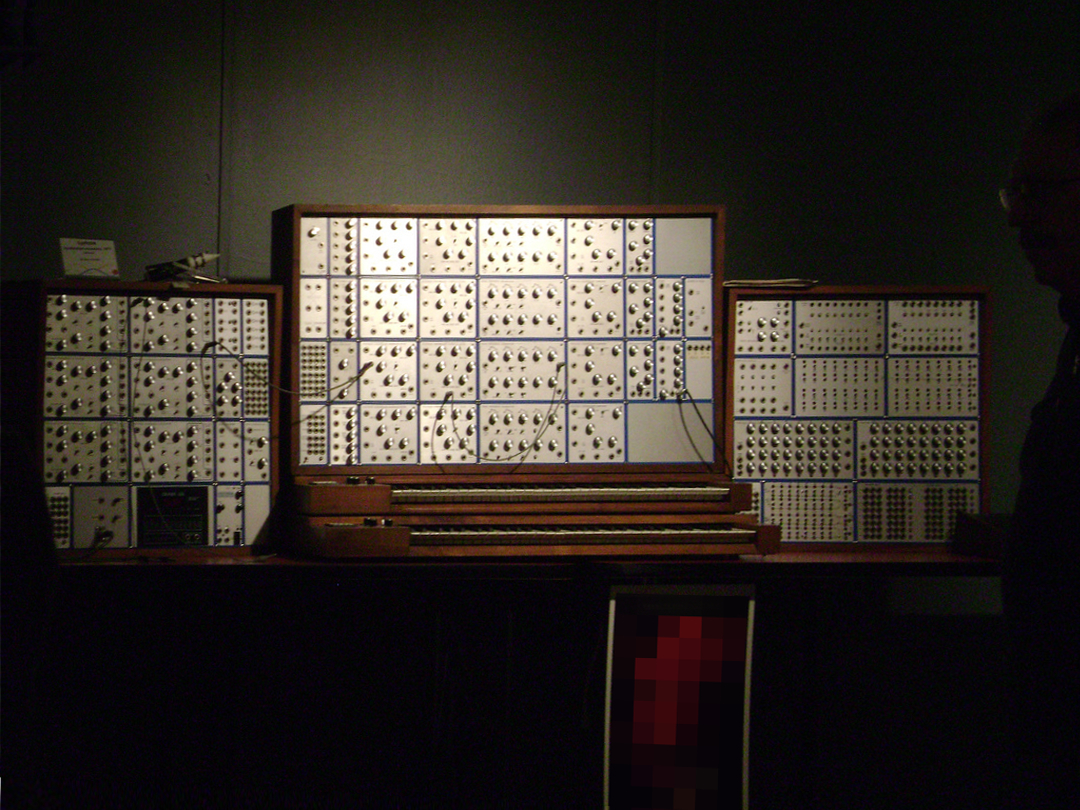
E-mu Modular System (exhibited at National Music Centre, Calgary)

The E-mu Modular System is an analog modular synthesizer built by E-mu Systems in 1974. It competed with synthesizers such as the ARP 2500, ARP 2600, and Moog modular synthesizers, although E-mu designed the instruments for mostly universities and notable musicians who submitted custom configuration requests. The Modular System's polyphonic keyboard and sequencer are controlled by a microprocessor. Around 100 units are thought to exist today.

== History ==
E-mu Systems, based in California, began producing the Modular System in 1972, as a competitor to the ARP 2500, ARP 2600, and Moog modular synthesizers of the day. The Modular System was their second production synthesizer, following the E-mu 25 in 1971. The E-mu 25 had been a "front panel" synthesizer, but E-mu developers Dave Rossum and Scott Wedge thought it would be more fun to build a modular synthesizer. Custom systems were produced for universities and high-profile musicians, the target markets for the Modular System. The systems were hand-built to the specifications of each customer. While around 100 units are still in circulation, mostly at universities, some sources claim that up to 250 were originally produced.

== Construction and operation ==
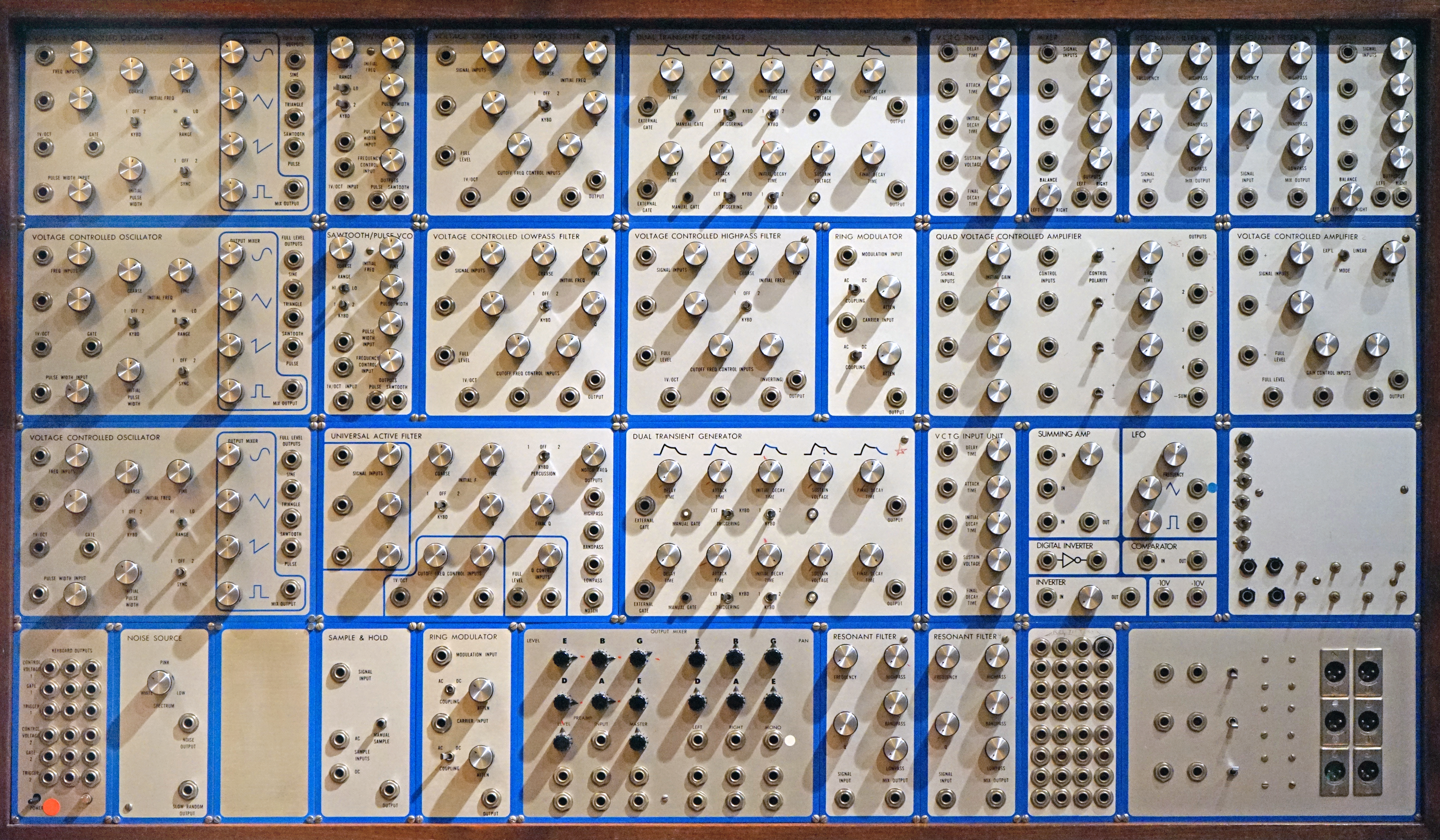
Details of E-mu Modular System (previously owned by Frank Zappa, exhibited at Musée de la Musique)

E-mu claims the Modular System's polyphonic keyboard and sequencer were the first to be controlled by a microprocessor, and they patented the technology at the time. The term "modular" in the product name refers to the customizable set of "modules" available for the synthesizer. Each customer would specify which modules they wanted from a list of available modules such as "Quad Inverter", "Sample-and-Hold", "Dual Reverb" and others.

Users create sounds by manipulating patch cords to direct the signal through the modules above the keyboard. In other words, different combinations of patch cord connections produced different sounds. Through all of the combinations available, the Modular System could produce any popular synthesizer sound in use at the time. Users could also save favored patch sequences using a "firm-wire" patch that connected to the instrument and could be swapped out at any time, recreating sounds without manipulating the patch cords. The Modular System was known to have a "cleaner" sound that its competitors, although that aspect was not always desired by users. It also had a unique aesthetic, featuring blue-lined modules rather than the traditional black and aluminum panels.

== Notable artists ==
- Danny Carey
- Vince Clarke
- Herbie Hancock
- Patrick Gleeson
- Hans Zimmer
- Meat Beat Manifesto
- Frank Zappa
- Ned Lagin
- Roger Linn
- Yellow Magic Orchestra
- Logic System
