= E-mu Drumulator =

Drum machine model

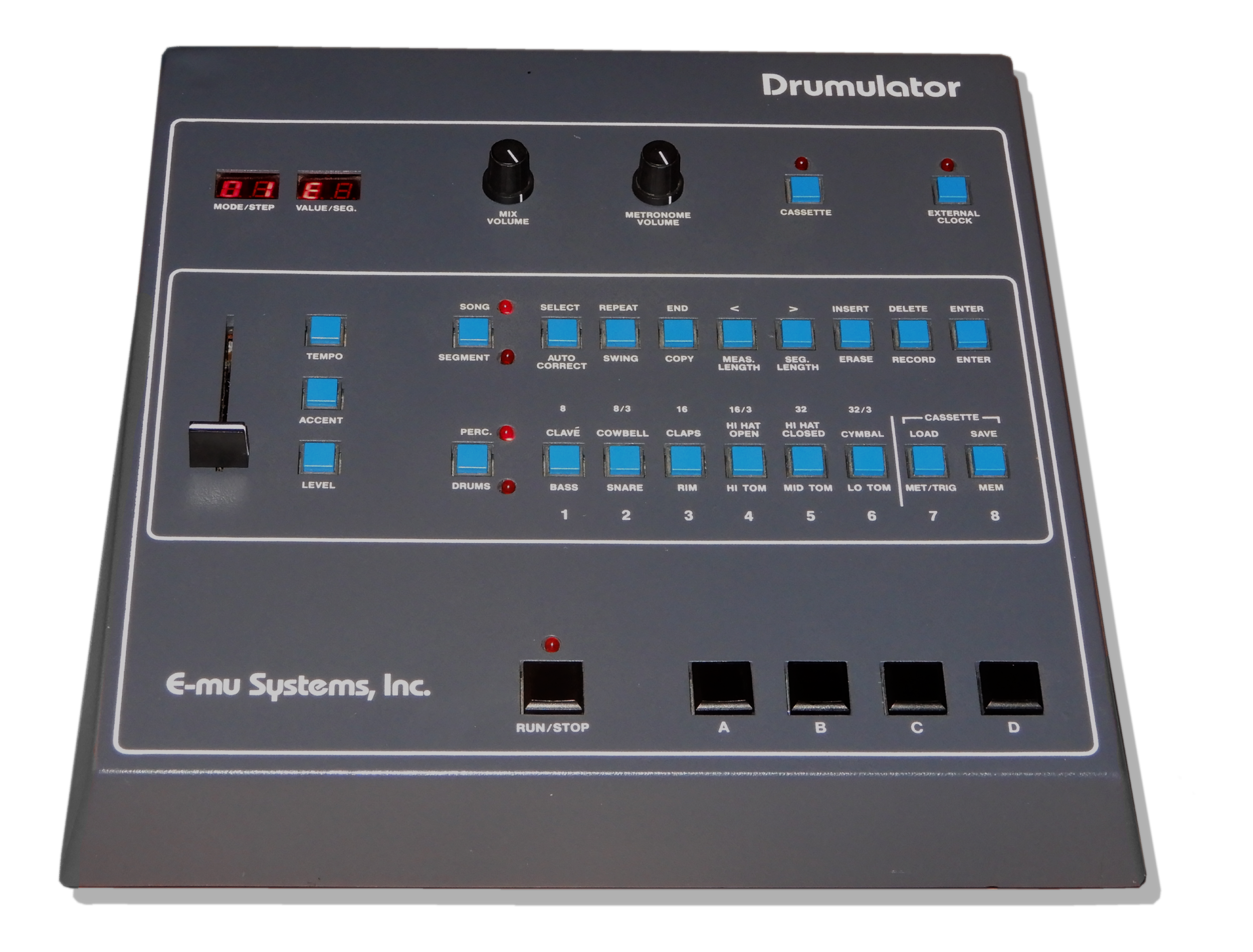

E-mu Drumulator is a sample-based drum machine by E-mu Systems. Introduced in 1983 at a price of US$995, the Drumulator was the first programmable drum machine with built-in samples for under $1,000, resulting in sales of over 10,000 units over two years. The Drumulator was the predecessor of the E-mu SP-12.

The Drumulator utilizes 8-bit samples for 12 sounds, including SSM analog filters. It was widely used in early 1980s in synth-pop and Italo disco productions. In 1984, Digidrums released special EPROMs for the Drumulator, which included the Rock Drums set used on Tears for Fears' hit "Shout" and on "Beastie Groove" for Beastie Boys by Rick Rubin.

== Notable users ==
Year	Artist	Album	Songs
1983	Cocteau Twins	Head over Heels	"My Love Paramour"
1983	Cocteau Twins	Sunburst and Snowblind	
1983	Depeche Mode	Construction Time Again	"Everything Counts", "Love, in Itself"
1983	Keith LeBlanc		"Malcolm X: No Sell Out"
1983	Valerie Dore		"The Night", "Get Closer"
1984	Camel	Stationary Traveller	"Vopo's"
1984	Fun Fun		"Color My Love"
1984	Howard Jones	Human's Lib	
1984	Kenny Loggins	Footloose	"Footloose"
1984	Rockwell	Somebody's Watching Me	"Somebody's Watching Me"
1984	Carol Jiani		"Touch and Go Lover"
1984	Cocteau Twins	Treasure	
1985	Bad Boys Blue		"Hot Girls, Bad Boys"
1985	Game Theory	Real Nighttime	"She'll Be a Verb"
1985	Lou Reed	OST White Nights	"My Love is Chemical"
1985	Tears for Fears	Songs from the Big Chair	"Shout" and "Everybody Wants to Rule the World"
1985	Front 242	No Comment	
1986	Nu Shooz		"I Can't Wait"
1986	Big Black	Atomizer	
1986	Ilaiyaraaja	Punnagai Mannan	
1987	Big Black	Songs About Fucking	
1987	Depeche Mode	Music for the Masses	"Never Let Me Down Again"
1991	Teenage Fanclub	Bandwagonesque	"Is This Music?"
2001	Liars	They Threw Us All in a Trench and Stuck a Monument on Top	"Mr Your On Fire Mr", "Tumbling Walls Buried Me in the Debris", "We Live NE of Compton"
	Ultravox		
