= E-mu SP-12 =

Computer/sampler

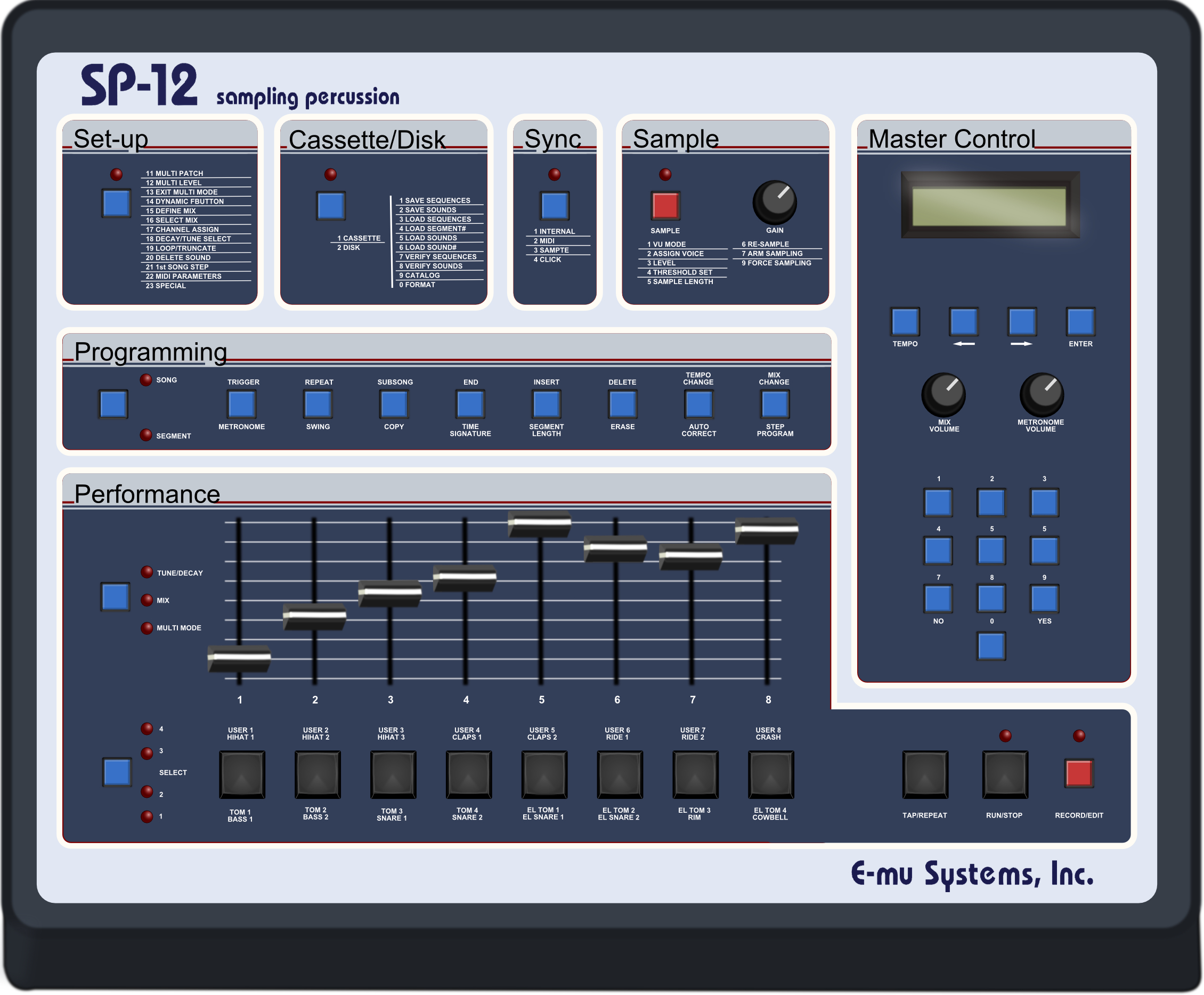
E-mu SP-12

The E-mu SP-12 is a sampling drum machine. Designed in 1984, SP-12 was announced by E-mu Systems in 1985. Expanding on the features of E-mu’s affordable and commercially successful Drumulator, a programmable digital drum machine, SP-12 introduced user sampling, enabling musicians to sample their own drums and other sounds. In August 1987, E-mu replaced SP-12 with SP-1200.

== History ==
Developed as a successor to the Drumulator, SP-12 was initially advertised as “Drumulator II” by E-mu Systems at the NAMM Winter Music & Sound Market and Musikmesse Frankfurt in February of 1985 before being launched officially at that summer’s NAMM International Music & Sound Expo. “SP” is an initialism for “Sampling Percussion,” and 12 is a reference to its 12-bit linear data format.

E-mu made a “Turbo” upgrade available which increased the total memory for user samples to 5 seconds. SP-1200, featuring an integrated disk drive for storage and more RAM allowing for more total user sampling time in place of the preset ROM drum sounds, replaced SP-12 in E-mu’s product line in August 1987.

== Features ==
In contrast to other early sampling instruments integrating piano-style keyboards, such as E-mu’s Emulator series of digital sampling synthesizers, Ensoniq Mirage, or Fairlight CMI, SP-12 instead used plastic buttons to play drum sounds on its top panel. Dynamics can be performed using a piezo sensor on the circuit board listening for the button’s impact, a technology invented by E-mu co-founder Scott Wedge.

SP-12 uses a 12-bit linear data format and the same 26.04kHz sample rate E-mu previously used in Drumulator and subsequently reused in SP-1200. The sample rate was chosen early on in Drumulator’s development as a compromise between bandwidth and sampling time. A reconstruction filter was deliberately omitted, resulting in a brighter sound due to imaging (sounds above the sample rate).

SP-12 includes 24 12-bit preset ROM sounds consisting of two bass drum, two snare, two electronic snare, rimshot, cowbell, four toms, four electronic tom, three hi-hat, two clap, two ride cymbal, and crash cymbal sounds. Although the panel legend is marked with 8 positions for user samples, up to 32 user samples can be used.

The original SP-12 had a maximum sampling time of 2.2 seconds while with the Turbo upgrade it has a maximum sampling time of 5 seconds. The SP-12 has a 5000-note memory allowing it to store 100 songs and 100 patterns; with the turbo upgrade, this is increased to 400 songs and 400 patterns.

SP-12 can synchronize to and generate MIDI, SMPTE, and analog click signals; it can also send and receive MIDI note triggers.

== Notable Users ==
- Ced Gee from Ultramagnetic MCs.
- Matt Dike.
- Daddy O.
- Bizarre Inc
- Claude Young
- Theo Parrish
- Def IV
- Paul C
- Prince Paul
- Rick Rubin in Rhymin & Stealin on the Beastie Boys album Licensed to Ill
- DJ Lethal

== See also ==
- Sampling (music)
- Music sequencer
