= Dave Rossum =

American electronics engineer and inventor

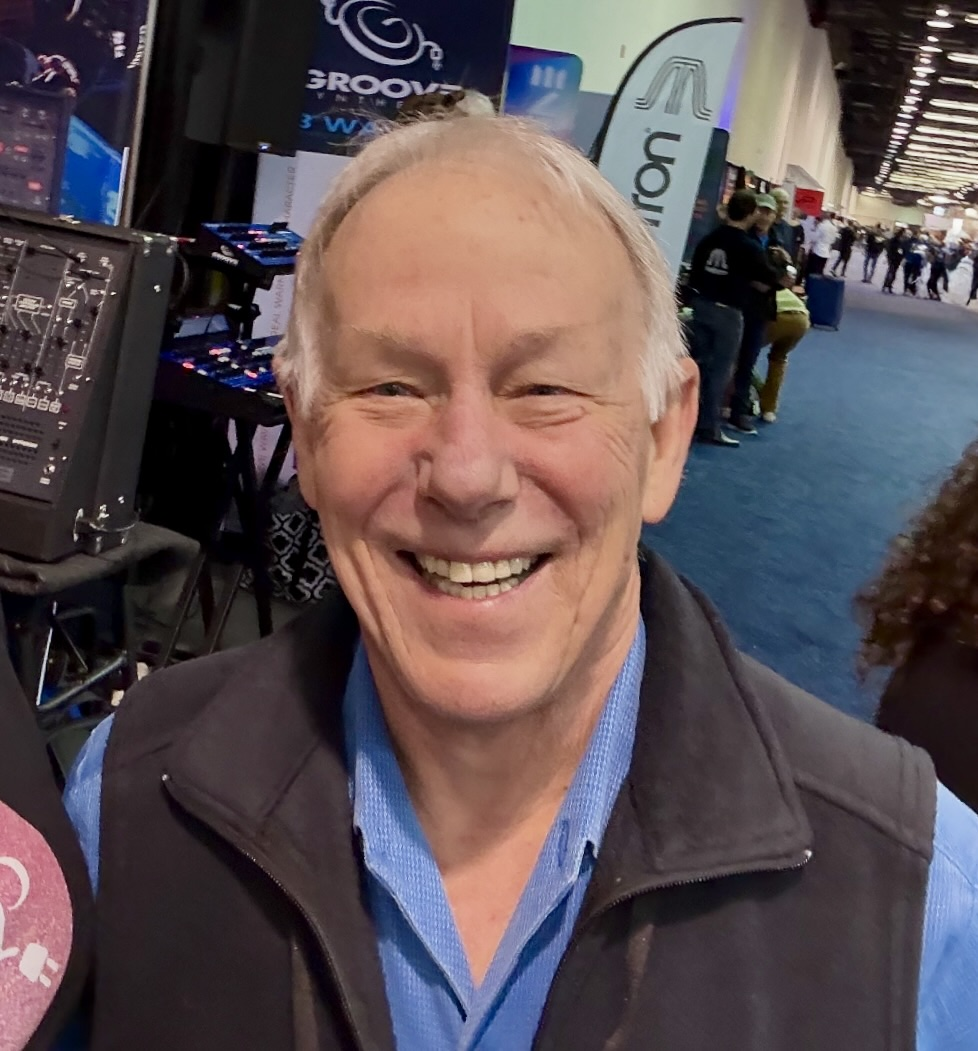
- Dave Rossum at the 2025 NAMM Show
- Born: David P. Rossum; 1949 (age 76–77)
- Engineering career
- Discipline: Biosciences
- Institutions: California Institute of Technology
- Projects: E-mu Systems
- Significant design: Digital scanning keyboard
- Website: rossum-electro.com

David P. Rossum (born 1948) is an American electronics engineer and inventor best known as the co-founder of synthesizer and sampler manufacturer E-mu Systems.

== Education and early career ==
Rossum grew up in the San Francisco Bay Area and attended the California Institute of Technology (Caltech), earning a Bachelor of Science in Biology in 1970.

Later that year while pursuing graduate studies at the University of California, Santa Cruz, Rossum's advisor, Harry Noller, invited him to join him in the music department where students were unpacking the university's new Moog Model 12 modular synthesizer. Rossum discovered an affinity for synthesis and invited his Caltech friends Steve Gabriel and Jim Ketcham to come see the Model 12. Together, they were inspired to start designing a synthesizer. In 1971 Ketcham heard there was a request for bid from the San Diego School District for music synthesizers to add to their high school music program, and Rossum and his friends decided to build a prototype in an attempt to win the bid. A company name was needed for invoices related to the parts purchased for these synthesizers, and Rossum came up with the name Eμ Systems. The completed prototype, which they named "Black Mariah" did not win, and they destroyed it by pushing it out the Dabney House library window. That summer, joined by high school friend Scott Wedge, Rossum used a $3000 inheritance from his grandmother to finance building another prototype, the E-mu 25. After completing the prototype, all but Rossum, Wedge, and Rossum's girlfriend, Paula Butler, decided to pursue other interests.

== Career ==
Rossum left graduate school and, in the fall of 1972, E-mu announced the E-mu Modular System, and on November 27, 1972, he and Wedge officially co-founded E-mu as a company located in an apartment unit in Santa Clara, California. In 1973 Rossum developed the E-mu 4050, the first digitally scanned polyphonic keyboard on the market,

Rossum met Tom Oberheim at the AES Convention in 1974 and the two became friends. He helped Oberheim with a circuit for dynamic control of Oberheim's phase shifter, which Oberheim Electronics patented with Rossum as the inventor. Similarly, Oberheim Electronics patented the polyphonic music synthesizer based on Rossum's polyphonic keyboard technology, with Rossum as the inventor. Oberheim Electronics licensed the polyphonic keyboard technology in the Oberheim Four Voice, one of the first production synthesizers capable of playing chords.

Together with Ron Dow, Rossum co-developed the first analog synthesizer integrated chips manufactured by Solid State Music (later Solid State Microtechnology for Music, or SSM).

In summer of 1977, he worked as a consultant for Dave Smith and Sequential Circuits, working on the operating system and analog circuits for the Prophet-5, which also licensed E-mu's digital scanning keyboard technology. Rossum also became friends with Roger Linn, and Rossum completed a design review of the LM-1 Drum Computer before it went into production.

In the 1980s Rossum and E-mu became pioneers in samplers, sample-based drum machines and low-cost digital sampling music workstations, with innovations like shared memory, looping, and multi-sampling, in such products as the Emulator series of samplers, the SP-12 and SP-1200 sampling drum machines. In 1985, Rossum won Seattle Silicon's IC design contest with his first DSP, the E-chip, which would be at the heart of the Emax.

E-mu was acquired by Creative Technology, Ltd in 1993, and Rossum became Creative's Chief Scientist from 1996 until 2011, when he went to work for Audience, first as Principal Technologist, then as Senior Director of Architecture.

In 2015, he joined Universal Audio as Technical Fellow. The same year, he co-founded Rossum Electro-Music, designing and manufacturing Eurorack synthesizer modules.

At the 2023 NAMM Show, in celebration of the 40th anniversary of the MIDI standard, the MIDI Association presented or posthumously presented lifetime achievement awards to Rossum, Don Buchla, Ikutaro Kakehashi, Tsutomu Katoh, Roger Linn, Bob Moog, Tom Oberheim, Alan R. Pearlman, and Dave Smith.

Rossum also holds 36 patents, mostly related to music technology. Many of these are used today throughout the industry.

== Personal life ==
Rossum is an avid mountain climber and was involved with Caltech's alpine club. In April 2015, he completed the Big Sur International Marathon, placing 14th in his age group. He has taught scuba diving, and serves on the board of directors of the California Marine Sanctuary Foundation.

== See also ==
- E-mu Systems
