= Roland MC-303 =

Groovebox by Roland Corporation

Roland MC-303 groovebox
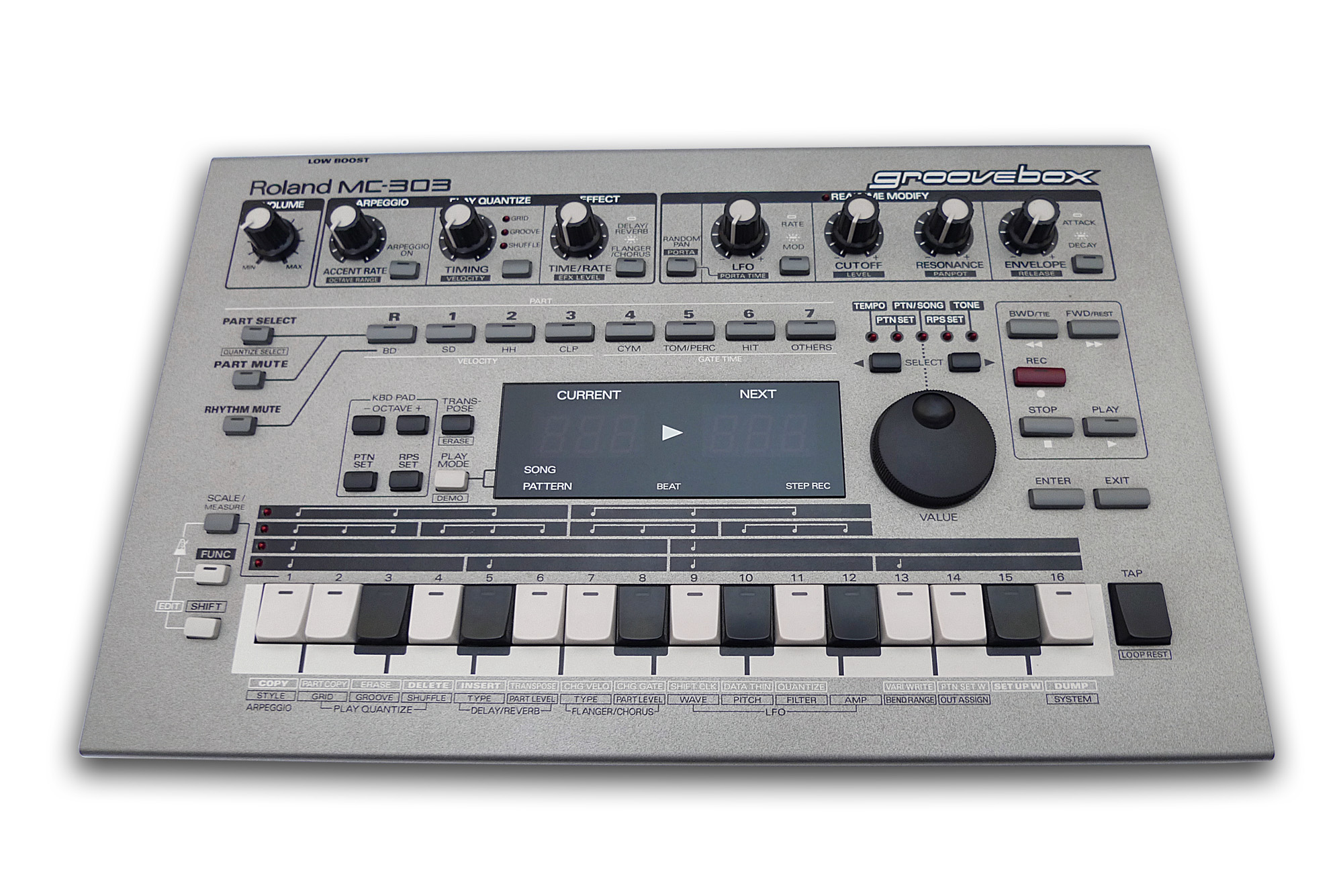
- Manufacturer: Roland
- Dates: 1996–1997
- Price: £565 UK, $699 US

Technical specifications
- Polyphony: 28-note
- Timbrality: 8-part multitimbral
- LFO: Yes
- Synthesis type: Sample-based synthesis (rompler)
- Storage memory: 448 preset sounds, 12 drum kits
- Effects: reverb/delay, chorus/flanger

Input/output
- Keyboard: No
- External control: MIDI in/out

The Roland MC-303 is the first of a series of musical instruments known as a groovebox. It combines a simple sound module with a sequencer to record and store notation, along with controls aimed at encouraging the musician to improvise the music while it is playing. Despite the number in its name and the attention it received at its launch, the MC-303 has more in common with other MC prefixed synthesizers (such as the Roland MC-202), which contain built-in sequencers, than it does with the famous Roland TB-303. As the first Groovebox, the MC-303 was the first in a line of inexpensive products specifically targeted towards house DJs and amateur home musicians rather than professional producers. It was superseded by the Roland MC-505. It is the predecessor to the Roland JX-305, Roland D2, Roland MC-307, Roland EG-101, Roland MC-09, Roland MC-909, Roland MC-808, and most recently the Roland MC-707 in 2019, along with its more portable sibling, the Roland MC-101.

== Features ==
The key features of the MC-303 are:

- Sound generator with 28 note - voice polyphony based on the structure model of Roland JV-80 synthesizer
- 8-track sequencer containing multiple quantize functions: Grid, Shuffle, and Groove. (7 pitched instruments and 1 drum kit)
- 16-part multitimbral
- 448 preset sounds and 12 drum kits (includes the Roland CR-78, TR-808, TR-606 & TR-909, electro, techno, jungle, house, drum & bass, breakbeat), 40 synth basses (TB-303, etc.), 35 synth leads, 33 synth pads
- Resonant filter, LFO, envelope control and built-in effects: delay, reverb, flanger and chorus
- Realtime Phrase Sequencer (RPS) for instant recall of musical phrases
- Low Boost Knob feature (Back panel, Only on the Roland MC-303): allowing you to dial in as much low-end as it takes to create powerful Kick or TR-808 Bass sounds so that anyone can 'feel' the groove.
- 300 onboard dance music variation patterns such as drumbeats and basslines
- Recording length of up to 32 bars per pattern
- Instant storage of up to 50 user patterns, 300 pattern variations and 10 songs
- Storage space for up to approximately 14,000 notes
- MIDI in and out connections (but no MIDI thru)

== Synthesizer/Sound Module ==
The synthesizer built into the Roland MC-303 is a rompler which contains sounds largely drawn from classic Roland synths and drum machines such as the TB-303, TR-808 and TR-909 along with the Juno series and various other dance themed sounds such as pads, pianos, strings and vinyl scratches. The sounds can be manipulated with a low-pass filter, various modulation capabilities and some simple DSP effects. It doesn't have a sampler, although the instruction book contains instructions for getting it to control an external sampler.

== Sequencer ==
The most important part of the MC-303 is its built-in pattern based 8 track sequencer. Each pattern can contain up to 32 bars. It can record and send MIDI data via the MIDI jacks on the rear panel, enabling its internal sequencer to control other sound modules, or its internal sound module to be controlled by an external sequencer. Although communication with other devices is possible, the main advantage to the MC-303 with its small form factor and all-in-one design is the ability to use it as a self-contained studio, albeit an amateur one. Featuring a micro-keyboard that can also be used as a drum sequencer, the MC-303 imitates the handling as well as the look and feel of other famous Roland synthesizers and drum machines such as the MC-202, TB-303, TR-808 and TR-909.

== Criticisms ==
One criticism made of the machine in various reviews, including the August 1996 issue of Sound on Sound magazine, was that the sound module was essentially limited to only playing built-in preset sounds, discouraging innovation. From a more technical perspective, a major concern was that any knob tweaks made during real time recording were not transmitted via MIDI. The number of preset patterns (mostly aimed for Trance and Techno music) outweighed the number of programmable user patterns which also discouraged innovation. Roland responded in part to these criticisms in its later grooveboxes by solving the MIDI problem, increasing the synthesis capabilities and user pattern storage and adding a sampler section.
