= Groovebox =

Musical instrument designed for live, loop-based music

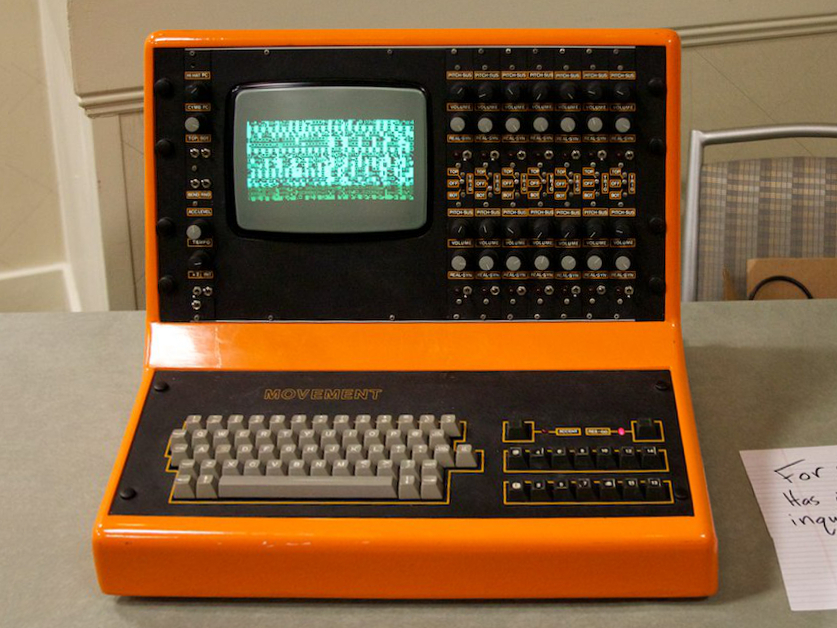
Movement Systems Drum Computer (c. 1981, UK) includes:
- Analog and sampled drum sounds
- Music sequencer
- CRT, keyboard and knob controllers

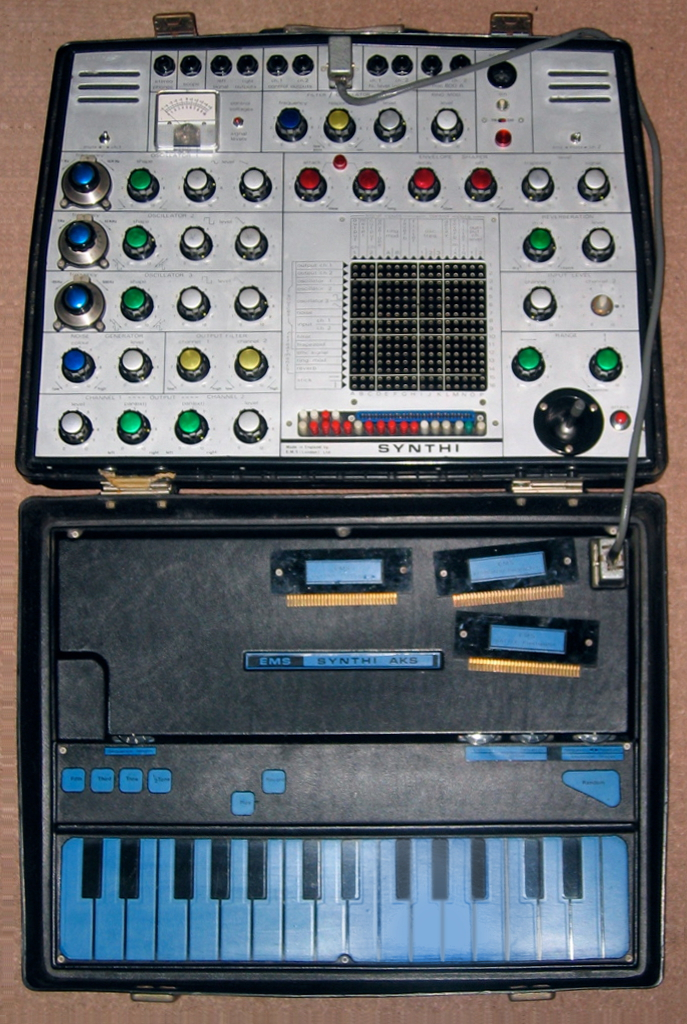
Electronic Music Studios (EMS) Synthi AKS (1972, UK) includes:
- Analog synthesizer
- Knobs
- Digital music sequencer with a touch-plate keyboard for input

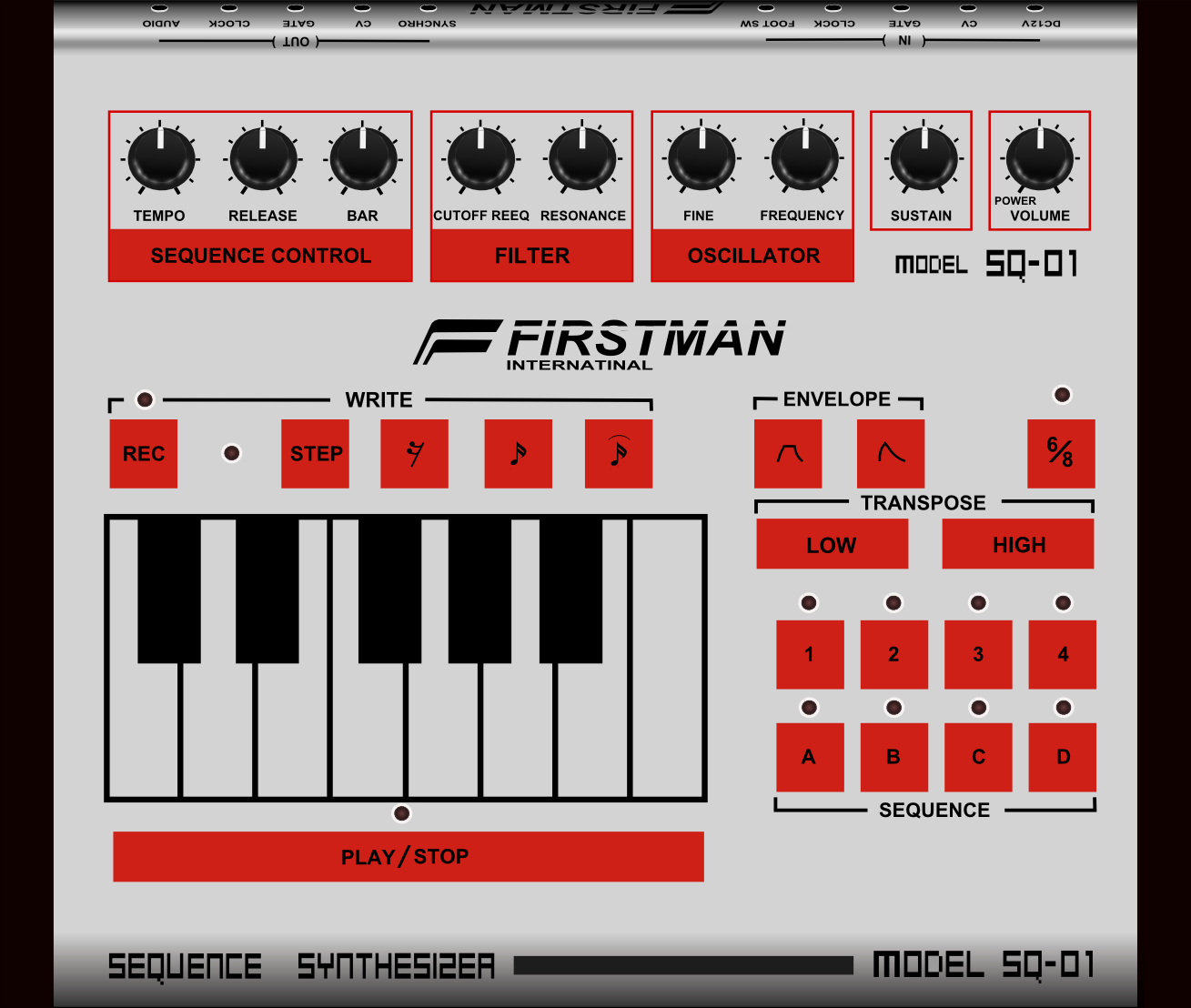
Firstman SQ-01 (1980)

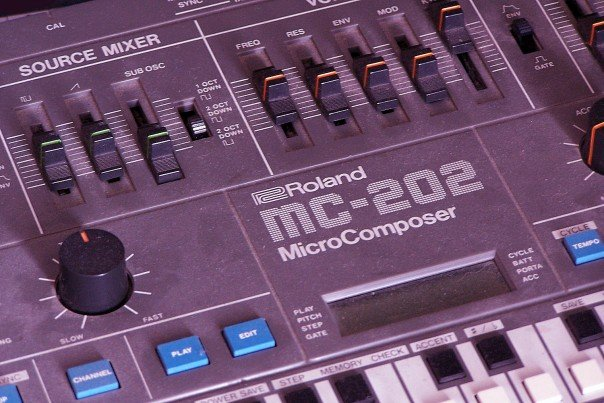
Roland MC-202 (1983)

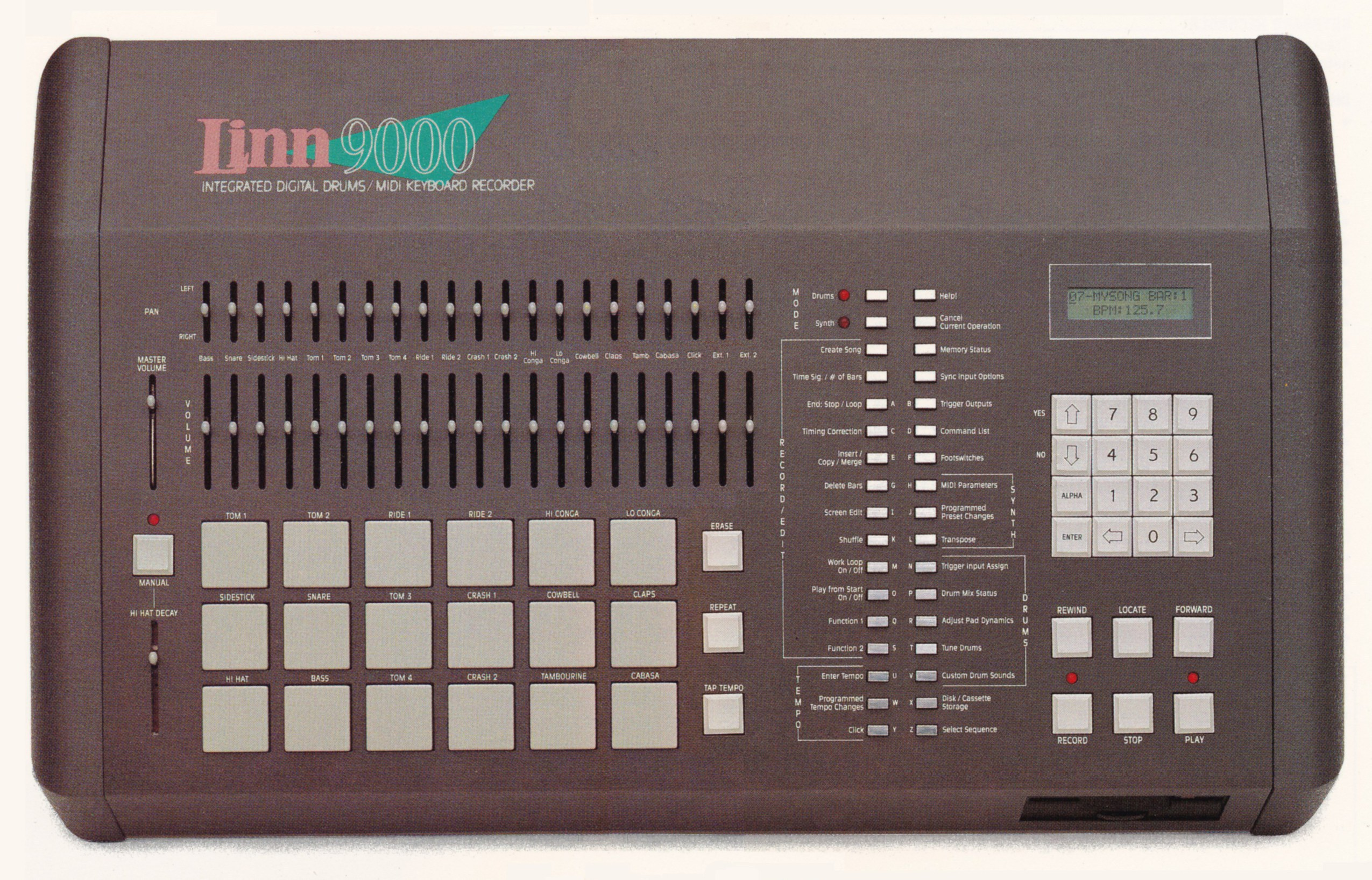
Linn 9000 (1984)

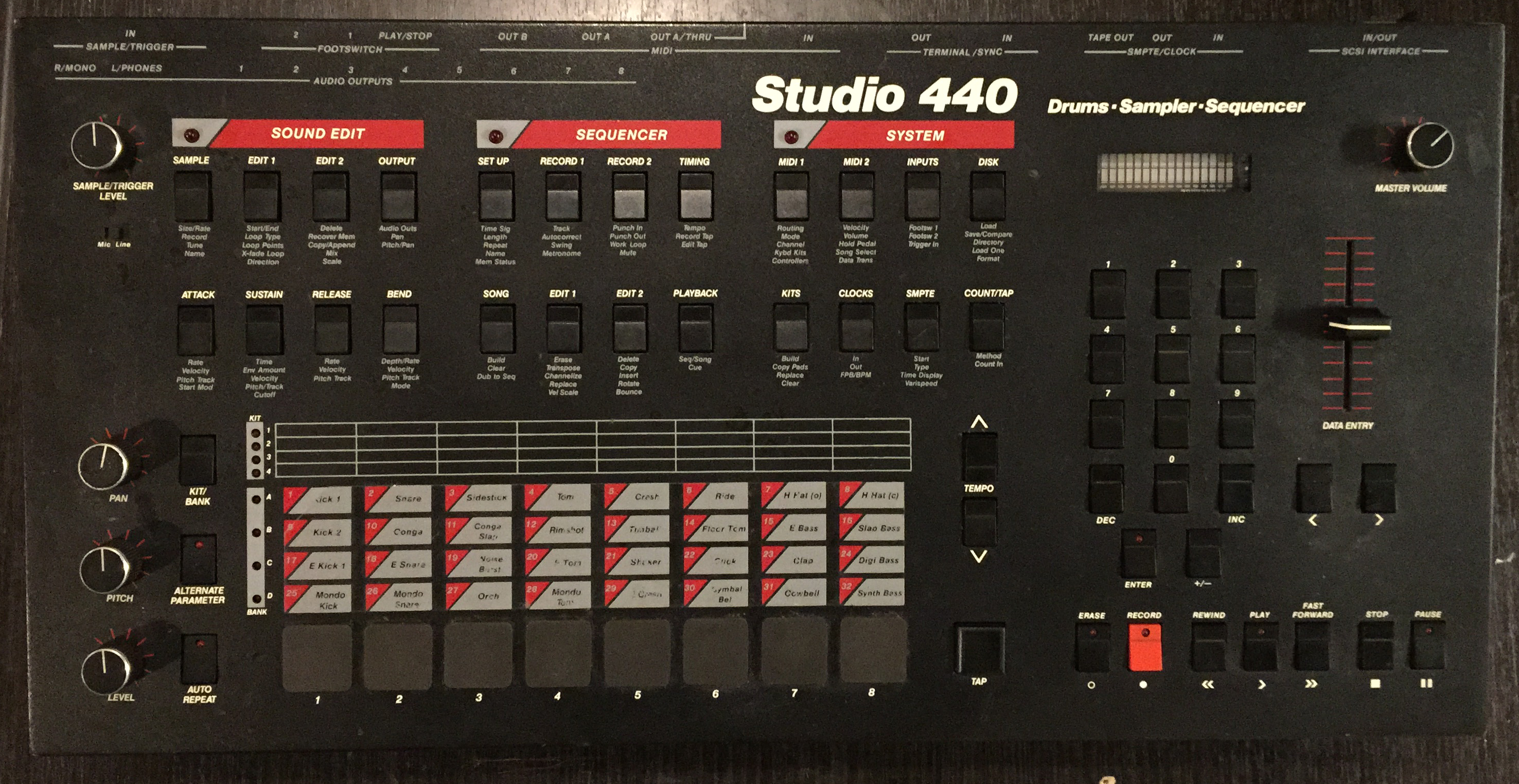
Sequential Circuits Studio 440 (1986)

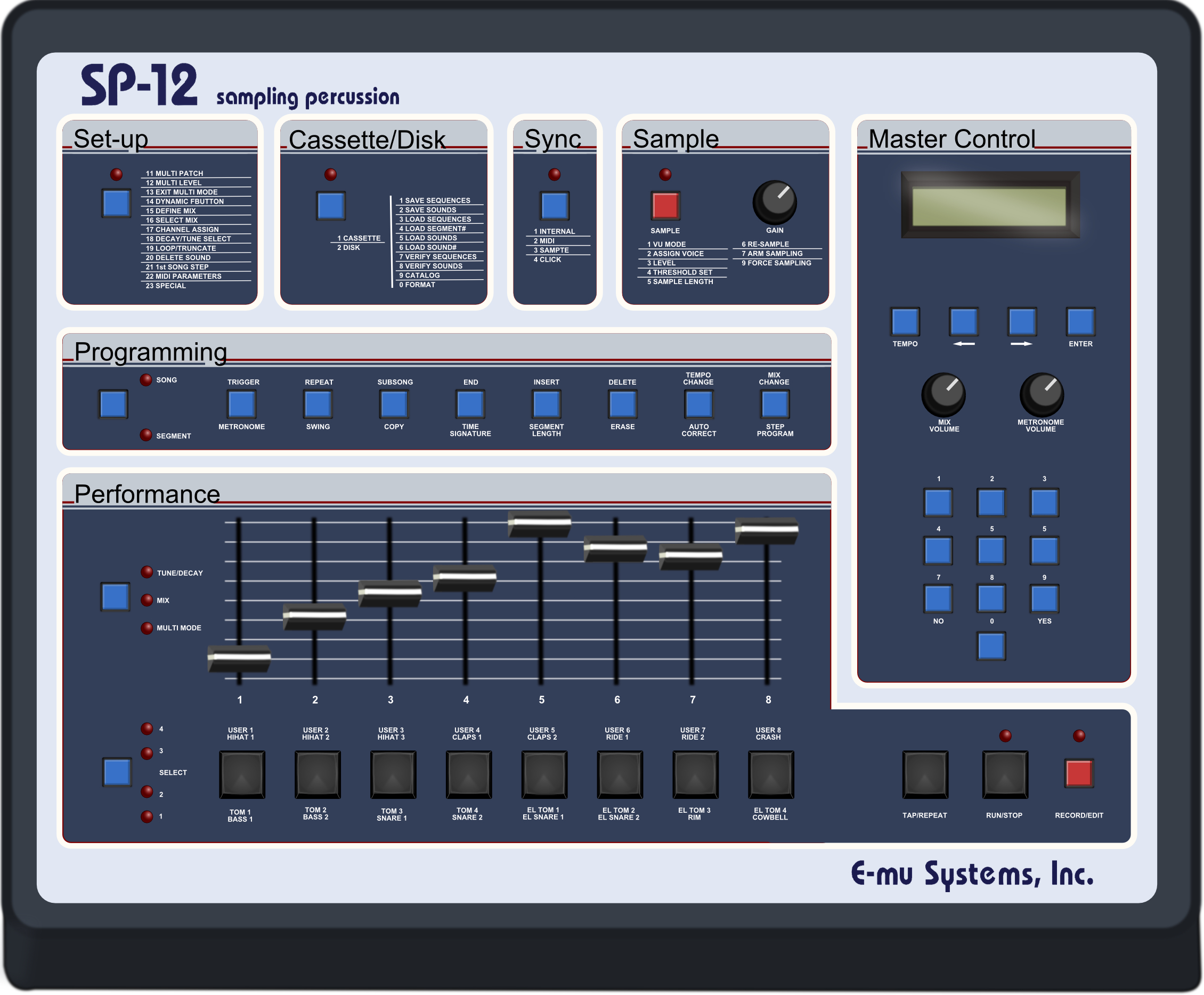
E-mu SP-12 (1986)

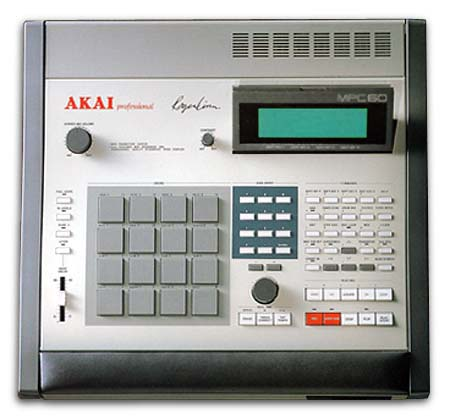
Akai MPC60 (1988)

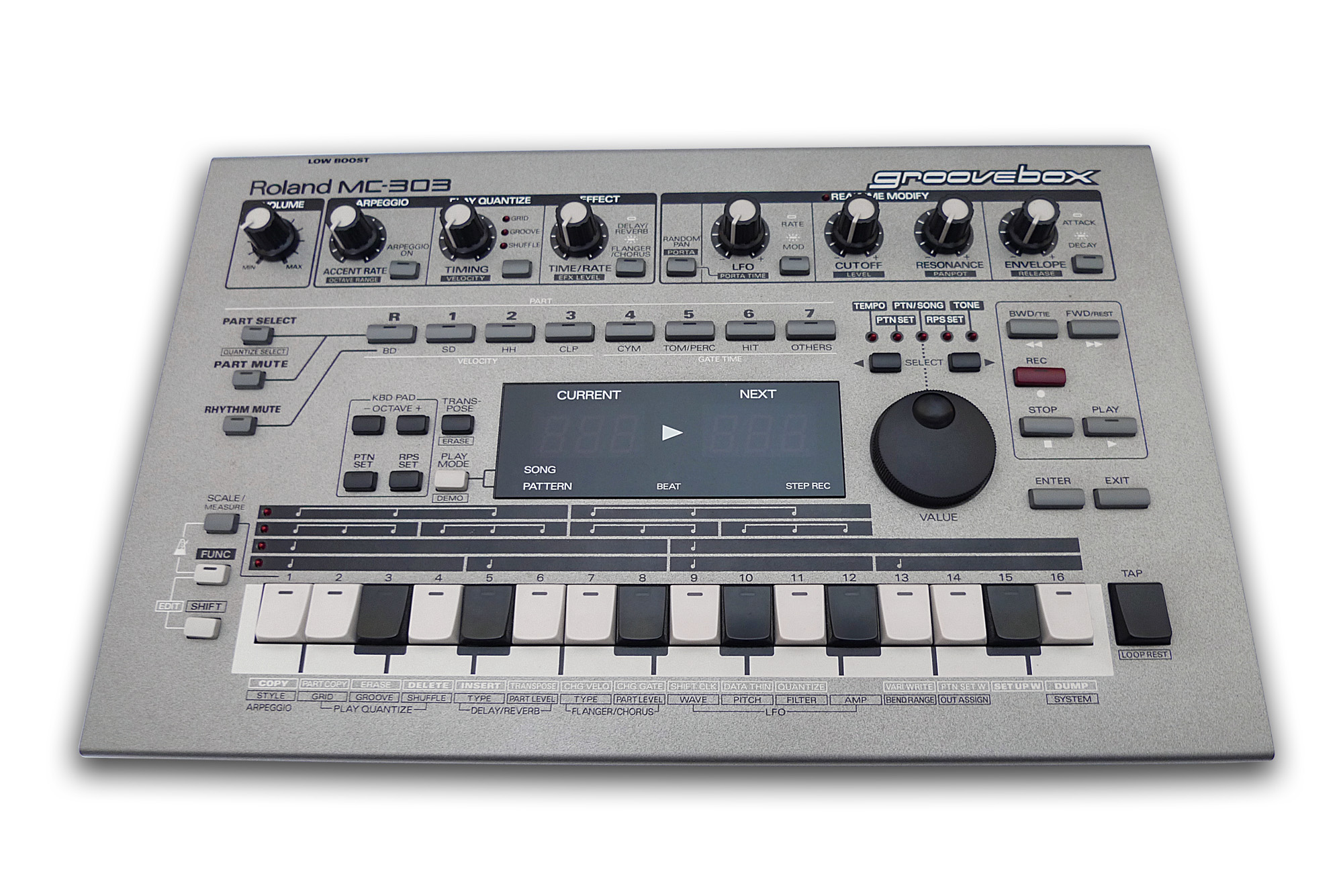
Roland MC-303 (1996)

A groovebox is a self-contained electronic or digital musical instrument for the production of live, loop-based electronic music with a high degree of user control facilitating improvisation. The term "Groovebox" was originally used by Roland Corporation to refer to its MC-303, released in 1996. The term has since entered general use, and the concept dates back to the Movement Computer Systems Drum Computer in 1981 and Fairlight CMI Page R in 1982.

A groovebox consists of three integrated elements.

- One or more sound sources, such as a drum machine, a synthesizer, or a sampler
- A music sequencer
- A control surface that is a combination of knobs (potentiometers or rotary encoders), sliders, and/or buttons, and display elements (LEDs and/or an LCD screen)

The integration of these elements into a single system allows the musician to rapidly construct and control a pattern-based sequence, often with multiple instrumental or percussion voices playing simultaneously.

These sequences may also be quickly chained together into a song in a live performance. Grooveboxes allow sequences and songs to be saved, retrieved from memory, and inserted into the current performance whilst playing. In some cases, an entire musical performance may be created by a single player with a single groovebox. In other cases, the groovebox is simply one instrument amongst many. This is reflected by the large variety of grooveboxes available, ranging from Roland's lower-end MC and SP products which include basic sequencing and sampling capabilities, to Akai's flagship MPC 4000 and 5000, Yamaha's RS7000 or Roland's own MV-8800 which include features such as high-end sampling, high-polyphony synthesizers, and extensive sequencing, connection and storage possibilities.

Groovebox style instruments have facilitated many performers, both amateur and professional, who may have previously been unfamiliar with electronic music, to explore the genre. Whilst some in the genre initially derided these instruments (in particular the MC-303) and the opening of the field as leading to a drop in standards, they are now generally accepted as having a legitimate place in the form. In addition, many performers and bands from outside the electronic community have integrated groovebox instruments into their shows, as a convenient way of incorporating electronic sound into a more traditional format. The sequencer and control aspects of a groovebox may be used to control an external instrument over MIDI, and the internal voices may similarly be controlled by external equipment.

A groovebox is similar to a music workstation. The general differences are that it will often omit, or include only a simplified keyboard, is designed to be portable, and will usually include more user controls. Whereas a workstation is often targeted towards studio musicians and composers, grooveboxes are designed more to suit the needs of live performers. However, units matching either description are used both on stage and in the studio. A defining characteristic of a groovebox is the ability for the performer to alter both the sequence and the sound parameters in real time, without interruption of the performance. Units marketed as such, which have failed to implement this feature correctly, or at all, have not been well received.

The Roland Groovebox may also be compared to drum machines such as the earlier Roland TR series (606, 808, 909 etc.), or to their TB-303, and the term has retroactively been applied to such units.

== Models ==
In the entry order of each manufacturer:

- 1972: Electronic Music Studios (EMS) Synthi AKS (analogue synthesizer with an embedded digital music sequencer and a touch-plate keyboard for input)
- 1980: Firstman SQ-01 (step sequencer with embedded analogue synthesizer and knob controllers)
- 1981: Movement Computer Systems's Movement Drum System I (1981), Movement Drum System II (1983)
- 1983: Roland Corporation's MC-202 (1983–1985) (analogue synthesizer based on SH-101 with an step sequencer and a push button keyboard for input)
- 1984: Linn Electronics's Linn 9000 (1984–1986)
- 1986: Sequential Circuits Studio 440 (1986–1987)
- 1986: E-mu Systems SP-12 (1986), SP-1200 (1987), Launch-Pad (1996), Command Stations [XL-7], MP-7, PX-7 (2001)
- 1986: Korg DDD-1 (1986), Electribe series (1999–), Monotribe (2011), Volca series (2013)
- 1986: Yamaha RX5 (1986), RX7 (1987), SU700 (1998), RM1x (1999–2002), RS7000 (2001), DX200 (2001), AN200 (2001)
- 1988: Akai's MPC series — MPC60 (1988), MPC60 II (1991), MPC500 (2006), MPC1000 (2003), MPC2000 (1997–2000), MPC2000XL (1999–2004), MPC2500 (2005), MPC3000 (1993), MPC4000 (2002–2008), MPC5000 (2008–2012), MPC One (2020), MPC Live (2017-2020), MPC Live II (2020), MPC X (2017)
- 1996: Quasimidi QM-309 Rave-o-lution (1996)
- 1996: Roland Groovebox MC-303 (1996–1997), MC-505, MC-307, MC-09, D2, MC-909, MC-808, SP-404, SP-606, SP-808, SP-555, MV-8000 (2003–2006), MV-8800 (2007–2010), EF-303, SH-32, MC-101 (2019), MC-707 (2019)
  Note: Roland's trademark "Groovebox" has been used since 1996, that is ten years after the establishments of generic Groove machines E-mu SP-12 in 1986.
- 1997: Ensoniq ASR-X (1997)
- 1998: Boss Corporation's SP-202, SP-303 (2001), SP-505 (2002)
- 1999: Zoom Corporation Sampletrak ST-224 (1999)
- 2004: Elektron Monomachine (2004–)
- 2004: Radikal Technologies Spectralis 1 (2004), Spectralis 2 (2009)
- 2009: Native Instruments Maschine (2009–)
- 2010: Beat Kangz Electronics's Beat Thang (2010–)
- 2015: Novation Circuit
- 2016: Pioneer DJ (with Dave Smith) TORAIZ SP-16 (2016), TORAIZ AS-1 (2017)
