= Roland MC-307 =

Groovebox model

Roland MC-307 groovebox
- Manufacturer: Roland
- Dates: 1999–2003
- Price: £782 UK, $1299 US

Technical specifications
- Polyphony: 64-note
- Timbrality: 16-part
- Oscillator: Yes
- LFO: Yes
- Synthesis type: Sample-based synthesis (rompler)
- Filter: Yes
- Storage memory: 800 preset sounds, 40 drum kits
- Effects: reverb/delay, chorus/flanger

Input/output
- Keyboard: No
- External control: MIDI in/out

The Roland MC-307 is a combination of MIDI music sequencer, synthesizer, drum machine and control surface produced by the Roland Corporation. This combination is commonly referred to by Roland as a 'Groovebox'.

It is a scaled-down version of the Roland MC-505. It has the same tone generator, but a much smaller control surface. It does, however, have several features that make it an ideal clock source for musicians wanting to do beatmatching. These include a large, very granular tempo slider similar to the sliders found on a modern phonograph and 'push' and 'hold' buttons that permit temporarily slowing down or speeding up the beat clock.

It can also transmit MIDI Machine Control and MIDI beat clock, and slave to external beat clock sources such as other Roland grooveboxes. It can be used as a sequencer to drive external synthesizer units. It is the successor to the Roland MC-303 and Roland MC-505, and the predecessor to the Roland MC-909 and the Roland MC-808.

== Features ==
The key features of the MC-307 are:

- Sound generator with 64-note polyphony
- 8-track sequencer+Tempo/Mute Ctrl Track
- 4 assignable CC MIDI knobs
- 240 onboard dance music patterns
- MIDI
