= Roland MC-808 =

Roland MC-808 sampling groovebox
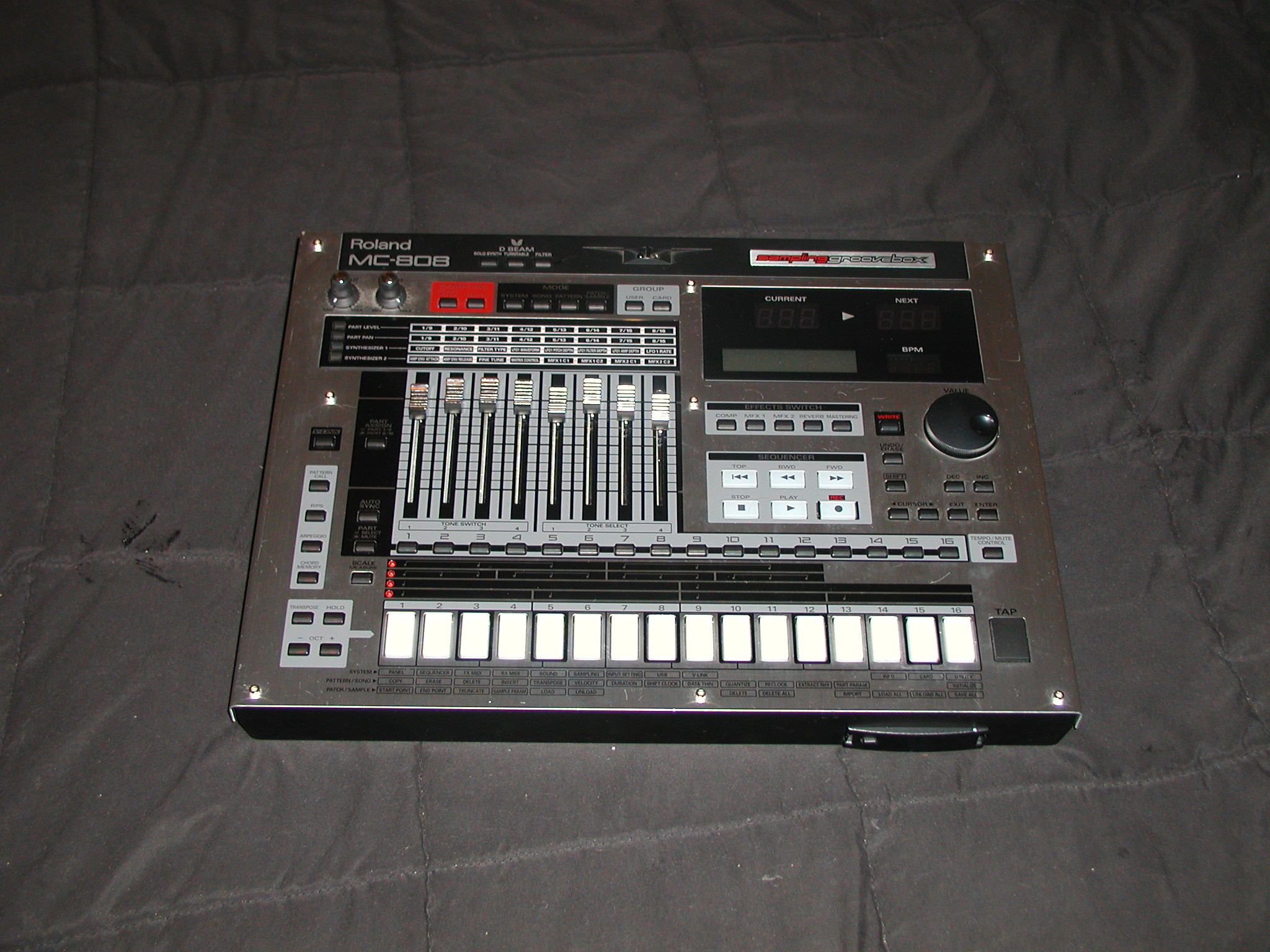
- Manufacturer: Roland
- Dates: March 2006–Early 2008
- Price: £715 UK, $1249 US

Technical specifications
- Polyphony: 128-note
- Timbrality: 16-part
- Oscillator: Yes
- LFO: Yes
- Synthesis type: Sampler (musical instrument) (rompler)
- Filter: Yes
- Storage memory: 16MB; expandable to 512MB; ROM: 1,024 patches, 128 rhythm sets, RAM: 256 patches, 128 rhythm sets, CompactFlash slot
- Effects: reverb/delay, chorus/flanger

Input/output
- Keyboard: 1⅓-octave (16-keys) non-piano-style mini key set
- External control: MIDI in/out, USB

The MC-808 is a groovebox introduced by Roland in 2006. It is the successor to the late Roland MC-303, Roland MC-307, Roland MC-505 and Roland MC-909.

== Background ==
Roland first announced the MC-808 at the NAMM Show in January 2006. While less expensive than the Roland MC-909, the MC-808 has a number of features the MC-909 does not, including double the polyphony (128-voice) and motorized faders. It lacks the MC-909's SRX card expandability and turntable emulation. It supports more flash memory (1GB CompactFlash,) and more RAM (up to 512MB,) than did the Roland MC-909. It has a 2-line segment built-in LCD that is less flexible - similar to the late Roland MC-505, and much smaller than the Roland MC-909 large LCD screen. It also has a large LED display, similar to the Roland MC-303. The Roland MC-808 requires a USB connection to a computer for full patch editing, unlike the Roland MC-909. (However, the OS v1.03 update available on the Roland website allows for some patch editing without a computer, most notably sample chopping, including auto-chop.)

== Features ==
The key features of the MC-808 are:

- MIX OUTPUT Jack (L (MONO), R), DIRECT 1 OUTPUT Jack (L (MONO), R), INPUT Jack (L (MONO), R), Headphones Jack, MIDI Connectors (IN/OUT), USB Connector (USB MIDI, Mass Storage Class), DC IN
- Sound generator with 128 note - voice polyphony
- 16-track sequencer+Tempo/Mute Ctrl Track
- D-Beam controller
- Wave based synthesizer with fully programmable patches (including rhythm kits)
- 683 preset patterns
- Stores up to 800 patterns (each with 16-tracks called parts) in user memory, and up to 700 more on a Compact Flash card
- Three record modes (real time, step and TR mode)
- Song mode, which allows sequences of patterns to be recorded
- Sampler (Standard sample memory is limited, but sample memory can be expanded with a PC-100 or PC-133 DIMM up to 512MB)
- 7 banks of 128 user editable patches
- RPS sets, which can be used to trigger individual parts of patterns in real time
- Arpeggiator with 128 presets
- 16MB of user memory for storing patterns, songs, patches, RPS sets, pattern sets and samples
- 4MB of sample memory (to hold newly recorded samples, or samples for playback)
- RAM expansion slot (up to 1GB PC-100 or PC-133 DIMM)
- CompactFlash slot (up to 1 GB) (for storing patterns, songs, patches, RPS sets, pattern sets and samples)

The factory box comes with the following accessories: owner’s manual, sound and parameter list, AC adaptor, CD-ROM (with editor and USB MIDI driver), ferrite core, a band for fastening the core, and a leaflet ("Attaching the Ferrite Core").

== Sound Generator ==
The MC-808's sound generator produces sound from two different kinds of patches. A "standard" patch is made up of four tones. Each tone can have two different waveforms, one for the left channel and one for the right channel. Waveforms can be either preset waveforms, or samples (both work the same way.) Rhythm patches are made up of 16 tones, each one assigned to a note. Rhythm tones can be made up of up to four waveforms.

Tones are generated by a wave generator then sent to a Time Variant Filter (TVF) and then to a Time Variant Amplifier (TVA). The WG, TVF and TVA all have an envelope which controls their operation. Standard patches have two LFOs available, which can be assigned to modulate the WG, TVF or TVA. This design is similar to many synthesizers using subtractive synthesis. Rather than being restricted to a small number of waveforms, any wave file can be used as a waveform.

Some parameters can be modified in a patch using a fader. For more complete patch editing, the 808 must be hooked up to a computer via a USB cable running the 808's patch editor.

The sound generator allows for the routing of parts into two Multi-Effects(MFX) units. There are 46 different effects. Each MFX can be set to one of the 46 effects.

== Sequencer ==
The sequencer can play patterns, or songs that are made up of a series of patterns. Each pattern can have up to 16 parts. Each part is assigned to a patch.

Parts contain a sequence of MIDI events such as notes and control changes. There are three ways to record data to a part: step recording, realtime recording, and TR-Rec. Step recording allows the entry of notes step by step. Realtime recording allows both notes and control changes to be added. TR-Rec allows each of the 16-pads to represent a beat, and makes it easy to enter percussion tracks. There is also a microscope editing mode that allows detailed event editing.

Songs are made up of steps with each step having a pattern associated with it. Muting and unmuting parts can be done for each step. The overall level of each part can be modified at each step as well.

== Sampler ==
The MC-808 can import samples (as WAV or AIFF files,) and can also record samples from its input. Editing of samples can be done using the sample edit feature of the patch editor program. Some basic tasks can be done from the MC-808 without the need for the editor program. Newly recorded samples are stored in sample memory. Samples must be loaded into sample memory to play them as well. The MC-808 will automatically load samples into memory when needed. There are also some manual operations for loading samples into memory and unloading them. As shipped, there is 4MB of sample memory. Samples can be saved in user memory or card memory.

== Users ==
The Roland MC-808 was used prominently in the album Téo & Téa by French composer Jean Michel Jarre, who used some of the preset patterns as the base for a number of the tracks of that album.

DJ Uplighter and Friends uses the MC-808 on the album "Lighten Up New Synthesizer". The extracts used from the MC-808 are looped sound samples recorded with Audacity and trimmed to be used in Sony Acid Music Studio.

== Unsolved bugs ==
Some operating system bugs were gradually solved since its release; the last operating system upgrade (Version 1.03)* was introduced on January 15, 2007. (Note OS v1.03 update available on the Roland website allows for some additional patch editing without a computer, most notably sample chopping, including auto-chop.)*

There are current unresolved issues with the implementation of effects when switching patterns, but the MC-808 was "designed by specification". Roland might refer to the end users' requests for effects that sustain past the point when the pattern switches as they are "developing a future new product".
