= SRX =

SRX can refer to:

- Singapore Real Estate Exchange
- Cadillac SRX
- Yamaha SRX motorcycles
- Juniper Networks security product series
- SRX expansion boards by Roland
- Segmentation Rules eXchange standard
- Superstar Racing Experience, car racing series
- Ghardabiya Airbase IATA code
