= Roland MC-505 =

Groovebox model

Roland MC-505 groovebox
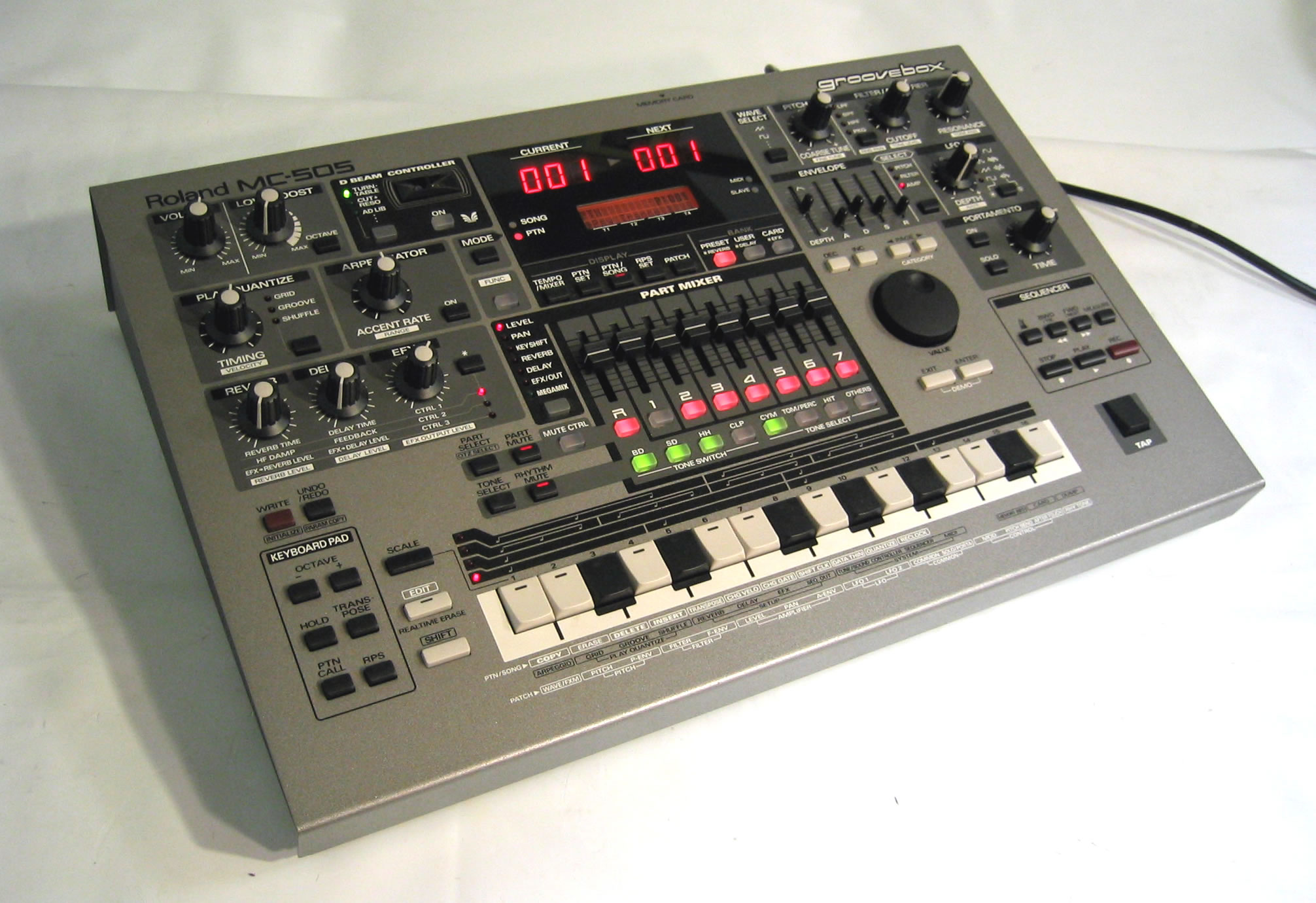
- Manufacturer: Roland
- Dates: 1998–2002
- Price: £782 UK, $1299 US

Technical specifications
- Polyphony: 64-note
- Timbrality: 8-part (Including a separate rhythm channel)
- Oscillator: Yes
- LFO: Yes
- Synthesis type: Sample-based synthesis (rompler)
- Filter: Yes
- Storage memory: 512 preset sounds, 26 drum kits
- Effects: reverb/delay, chorus/flanger

Input/output
- Keyboard: 1⅓-octave (16-keys) non-piano-style mini key set
- External control: MIDI in/out

The Roland MC-505 is a groovebox conceived in 1998 as a combination of a MIDI controller, a music sequencer, a drum machine, and a desktop synthesizer with many synthesis features: arpeggiator, oscillators, and voltage-controlled filter, control of attack, decay, sustain and release, different envelopes and 2 LFOs. It was released as the successor to the Roland MC-303 and is functionally related to the later-released Roland JX-305 Groovesynth, which added a 61-key full-sized keyboard but which lacked the MC-505's Megamix and D-Beam hardware and functionality. The Roland MC-505 is also the predecessor to the Roland D2, Roland MC-307, Roland MC-909 and the Roland MC-808.

== Features ==
The key features of the MC-505 are:

- 64 voice polyphonic digital subtractive synthesis engine (derived from the Roland JV-1080) with 251 different oscillator, acoustic and drum sample waveforms
- 512 built-in preset sounds, 256 user sounds & 26 rhythm sets (includes the Roland CR-78, TR-808, TR-606, TR-909, TR-707 and R-8)
- 8-track MIDI sequencer + Mute Ctrl Track
- Recording length of up to 32 bars per pattern
- 714 preset sequencer patterns, 200 user patterns, 50 user songs
- 3 multi-effect units: Reverb, Delay and 24 different EFXs
- Infrared D-Beam controller for hands-free sound modulation
- MEGAMix function for intuitive realtime mixing of beats and patterns
- 5 volt Smartmedia card slot for doubling user patch and pattern memory

== Tribute album ==
In 2000 the Grand Royal record label released a compilation album At Home with the Groovebox, where all the artists contributed a track primarily using the Roland MC-505. Artists included Beck, Money Mark, Air, Jean-Jacques Perrey and Pavement. This was considered to be an interesting and well received album.

== Notable artists ==
- Beck
- Chicks on Speed
- Cibo Matto
- Duo 505
- Eric Prydz
- Freddy Fresh
- Gustavo Cerati
- James McNally (Afro Celts)
- Kirlian Camera
- Lasgo
- The Legendary Pink Dots
- M.I.A.
- New Order
- Peaches
- Radiohead
- Rambo Amadeus
- Skinny Puppy
- Sean Lennon
- Grace Ives
- Juan Atkins
- I-F
- The Prodigy
