= Roland U-110 =

Synthesizer

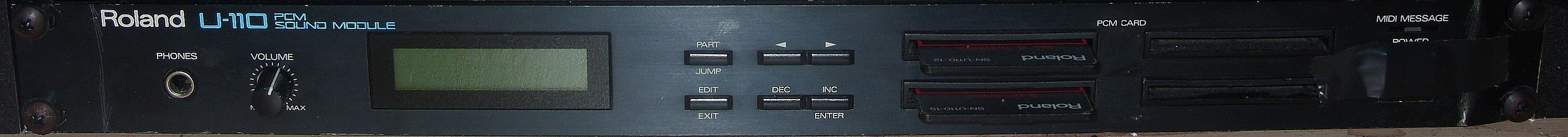
Roland U-110 with 2 PCM cards fitted

The Roland U-110 is a ROMpler synthesizer module that was produced by Roland Corporation in 1988.

The predecessor of the more successful U-20 keyboard and U-220 module, the U-110 was Roland's first dedicated sample playback synth. It used ROM to store sounds rather than loading them from disks into RAM, hence it was not a true sampler as it could not sample sounds.

The U-110 contained a base 2MB of sounds stored in ROM. It could be expanded with up to four Roland SN-U110 sound library cards, unlike the more popular Roland U-220 that could only accommodate two. It had six individual outputs, allowing for each instrument channel to be recorded separately, and two mix outputs to output all channels as a stereo pair.

== Specifications ==
Feature	Value
Polyphony	31 voices
Sound Generator	DC-PCM sound generator
Base Sample ROM	2MB consisting of 99 sounds
Patch Storage	64 internal memory locations
Expansion	2MB of extra sounds can be added by using up to 4 Roland SN-U110 PCM cards
Outputs	1 stereo mix output; 6 individual outputs (different output modes available); headphone jack (outputs stereo mix)
Multitimbral	Yes. 6 parts splitting the polyphony with each part, i.e. no dynamic voice allocation
Effects	Basic digital chorus and tremolo
Filters	None
Display	16x2-character LCD
Controls	6 front panel buttons and a volume knob for the mix/headphone output.

== List of SN-U110 ROM Cards ==
Card Number	Name
SN-U110-01	Pipe Organ and Harpsichord
SN-U110-02	Latin and FX Percussion
SN-U110-03	Ethnic
SN-U110-04	Electric Grand and Clavi
SN-U110-05	Orchestral Strings
SN-U110-06	Orchestral Winds
SN-U110-07	Electric Guitar
SN-U110-08	Synthesizer
SN-U110-09	Guitar and Keyboards
SN-U110-10	Rock Drums
SN-U110-11	Sound Effects
SN-U110-12	Sax and Trombone
SN-U110-13	Super Strings
SN-U110-14	Super Acoustic Guitar
SN-U110-15	Super Brass
