= Yamaha RM1x =

Groovebox

RM1x
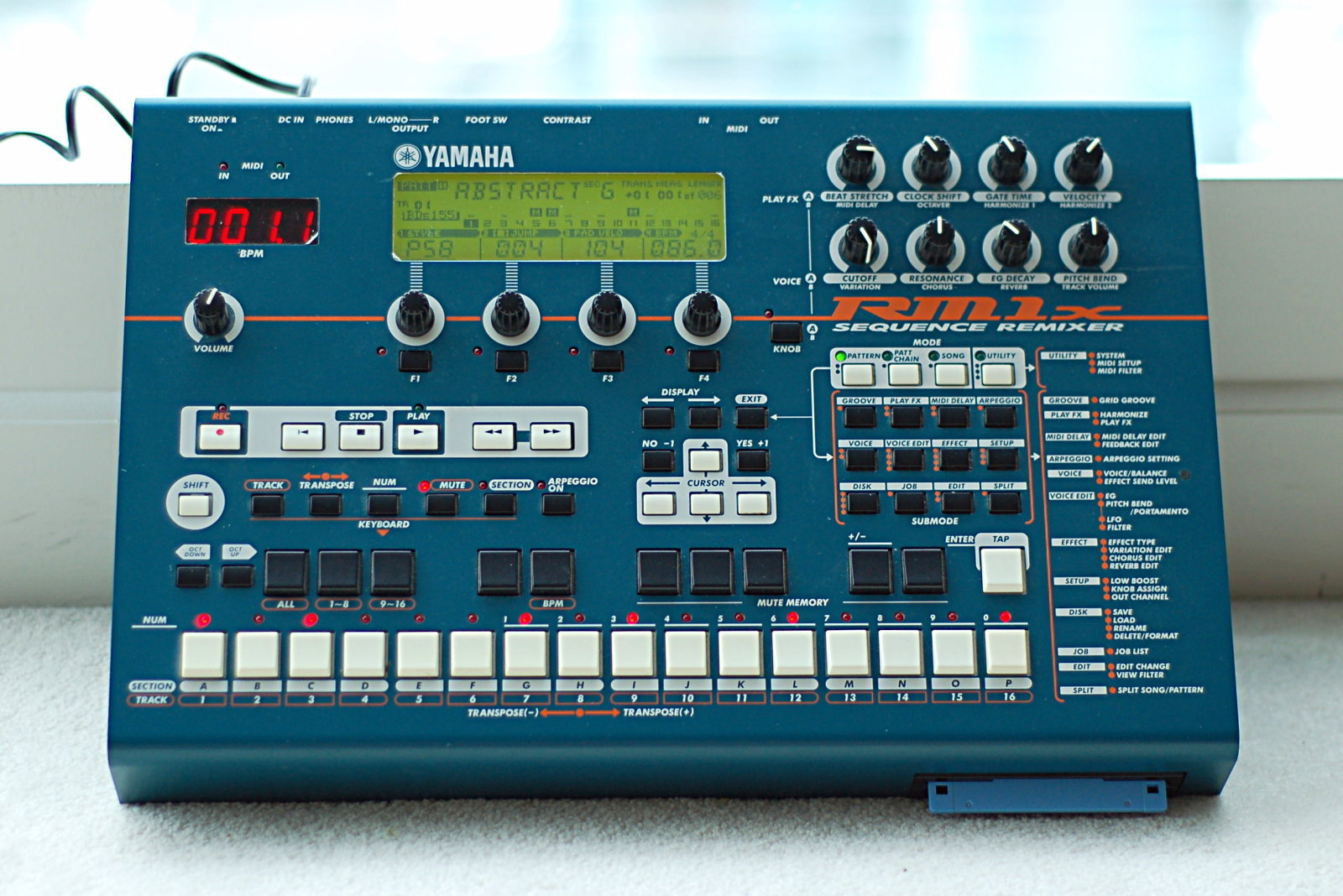
- Manufacturer: Yamaha
- Dates: 1999 - 2002

Technical specifications
- Polyphony: 32-voice (tone generator); 64-note (sequencer)
- Timbrality: 16-part multitimbral
- Oscillator: n/a
- Synthesis type: sample-based
- Filter: 1 per voice
- Aftertouch expression: No
- Velocity expression: No
- Storage memory: 654 patches 46 drum kits 60 styles 16 patterns per style 20 songs 110,000 note sequencer
- Effects: 1 insert, 2 send or 3 send

Input/output
- Keyboard: 2 octave, pushbutton
- External control: MIDI & foot switch

The Yamaha RM1x is a groovebox manufactured by Yamaha from 1999 to 2002. It integrates several, commonly separate, pieces of music composition and performance hardware into a single unit: a step-programmable drum machine, a synthesizer, a music sequencer, and a control surface.

The front panel of the RM1x is angled slightly to facilitate tabletop use but Yamaha also produced an accessory to allow rack-mounting the unit.

The RM1x is organized into five blocks: sequencer block, tone generator block, controller block, effect block, and arpeggio block.

== Sequencer block ==
The sequencer block has three modes of operation: pattern mode, pattern chain mode, and song mode.

All patterns, pattern chains, and songs are saved in non-volatile memory. The RM1x also has a 3.5" floppy disk drive for additional storage and archiving.

Patterns may be up to 256 measures long for looped playback, and up to 16 MIDI parts deep. Patterns may be grouped into named styles, with up to 16 patterns per style. Yamaha supplies 60 preset styles. Patterns may be programmed step-wise, like a drum machine, or recorded in real-time from MIDI input and control-surface buttons and knobs.

A sequence of patterns may be chained together in up to 999 chain slots.

The RM1x can save up to 20 songs at a time in memory, from sequenced or realtime recorded MIDI events.

== Tone generator block ==
The RM1x has a Yamaha AWM2 tone generator block, producing sound in response to sequenced events, the controller block, and from the MIDI IN connector. Up to 32 notes can be played simultaneously from 16 timbres selected from 654 voices and 46 drum kits.

Each voice has an independent filter with cutoff, resonance, and envelope control.

== Controller block ==
The unit's control surface consists of a backlit graphic LCD, many pushbuttons, potentiometers, and rotary encoders. The potentiometers are user-assignable and can control multiple MIDI parameters in real time during recording or performance.

A two octave pushbutton keyboard may be played in real time or used during stepwise pattern recording. This keyboard does not generate MIDI velocity or after touch information but the AWM2 tone generator will respond to such information if delivered by one of the real time knobs or an external MIDI controller.

Visual feedback comes from individual red and green LEDs, several red seven segment LEDs, and a 240×64 pixel LCD with green backlighting.

The main sequencer CPU is a Renesas (formerly Hitachi) model 7014 SuperH-2 running at 28 MHz. Latest Main ROM Operating System version 1.13 is located in socket IC2 (42 pin dual-inline package DIP).

== Effect block ==
Three effect systems are available simultaneously in the effect block: reverb, chorus, and variations.

Reverb effects include hall, room, stage, plate, "white room", tunnel, and basement. Chorus effects include conventional, 3-phase LFO "celeste", and flanger.

Variation effects include delays, echos, cross delays, early reflections, gate reverbs, reverse gate reverbs, rotary speakers, tremolo, auto-pan, phaser, distortion, overdrive, amp simulations, auto-wah, and equalizers.

A digital low-boost with +/- 24 dB gain and selectable boost frequency is also available.

== Arpeggio block ==
Arpeggios can be played on the built-in keyboard (not on external keyboard) in realtime, during performance or recording. Arpeggios may move up, down, or randomly with several sorting, holding, octave range, and transposition options.

== Notable users ==
Apollo 440, The Birthday Massacre, Darude, Legowelt, Nataraj XT and Soul Coughing are reported to be RM1x users.
