= Sweet Dreams (Are Made of This) =

1983 single by Eurythmics

- Picture sleeve for most releases

Single by Eurythmics

from the album Sweet Dreams (Are Made of This)
- B-side: "I Could Give You (A Mirror)"
- Released: 24 January 1983
- Genre: Synth-pop; new wave; electronic
- Length: 3:36 (single/album version); 4:48 (12" version)
- Label: RCA
- Songwriters: Annie Lennox; David A. Stewart
- Producer: David A. Stewart

Eurythmics singles chronology
"Love Is a Stranger" (1982)	"Sweet Dreams (Are Made of This)" (1983)	"Love Is a Stranger" (reissue) (1983)
"Love Is a Stranger" (second reissue) (1991)	"Sweet Dreams (Are Made of This) '91" (remix) (1991)	"I Saved the World Today" (1999)

Music video
- "Sweet Dreams (Are Made of This)" on YouTube

"Sweet Dreams (Are Made of This)" is a song by the British synth-pop duo Eurythmics. It was released in January 1983 by RCA Records as the fourth and final single from their second album, Sweet Dreams (Are Made of This) (1983). It was Eurythmics' breakthrough hit, establishing them worldwide. It reached number two on the UK singles chart in March 1983 and number one on the US Billboard Hot 100 six months later; it was the first Eurythmics single released in the US.

With Annie Lennox appearing with orange cropped hair and wearing a man's business suit in the music video, which was directed by Chris Ashbrook, the BBC stated Lennox's "powerful androgynous look" was the music video that "broke the mould for female pop stars". Rolling Stone called the song "a synth-pop masterpiece that made Lennox and Dave Stewart MTV superstars".

After the success, Eurythmics' previous single, "Love Is a Stranger", was rereleased and became a worldwide hit. On Rolling Stone's The 500 Greatest Songs of All Time issue in 2003, "Sweet Dreams (Are Made of This)" was ranked number 356. In 2020, the song was inducted into the Grammy Hall of Fame. In 2023, it was selected by the US Library of Congress for preservation in the National Recording Registry. Eurythmics have regularly performed the song in all their live sets since its release—with an early television performance coming on the BBC's Top of the Pops in February 1983—and it is often performed by Lennox on her solo tours.

Recorded by Eurythmics in a small project studio in the attic of an old warehouse in North London where they were living, the song's success heralded a trend of musicians abandoning larger recording studios for home recording methods. In 1991, the song was remixed and reissued to promote Eurythmics' Greatest Hits album. It re-charted in the UK, reaching number 48, and was also a moderate hit in dance clubs. Another remix by Steve Angello was released in France in 2006, along with the track "I've Got a Life".

== Background ==
=== Composition ===
Annie Lennox and Dave Stewart wrote "Sweet Dreams (Are Made of This)" after their previous band, the Tourists, had broken up and they formed Eurythmics. Although the two of them also broke up as a couple, they continued to work together. They became interested in electronic music and bought new synthesizers to play around with. According to Stewart, he managed to produce the beat and riff of the song on one of their new synthesizers, and Lennox, on hearing it, said: "What the hell is that?" and started playing on another synthesiser, and beginnings of the song came out of the two duelling synths.

According to Lennox, the lyrics reflected the unhappy time after the breakup of the Tourists, when she felt that they were "in a dream world" and that whatever they were chasing was never going to happen. She described the song as saying: "Look at the state of us. How can it get worse?" adding "I was feeling very vulnerable. The song was an expression of how I felt: hopeless and nihilistic." Stewart thought the lyrics too depressing and added the "hold your head up, moving on" line to make it more uplifting.

Commenting on the line "Some of them want to use you [...] some of them want to be abused", Lennox said that "people think it's about sex or S&M, and it's not about that at all." On the song's title she said, "Apparently, it's the most misheard lyric in British pop. People think I'm singing: 'Sweet dreams are made of cheese.'"

=== Recording ===
"Sweet Dreams (Are Made of This)" was created and recorded in two places, first in Eurythmics' tiny project studio in the attic of an old warehouse in the Chalk Farm district of North London where they were living at the time, then in a small room at the Church Studios in north London. The home studio was equipped with a Tascam 80–8, 8-track half-inch tape recorder, a Soundcraft mixer, a Roland Space Echo, a Klark Teknik DN50 spring reverb, a B.E.L. Electronics noise reduction unit, and a single Beyerdynamic M 201 TG microphone. The gear was purchased second-hand after Lennox and Stewart obtained a bank loan for £5000 (equivalent to £18,000 in 2025).

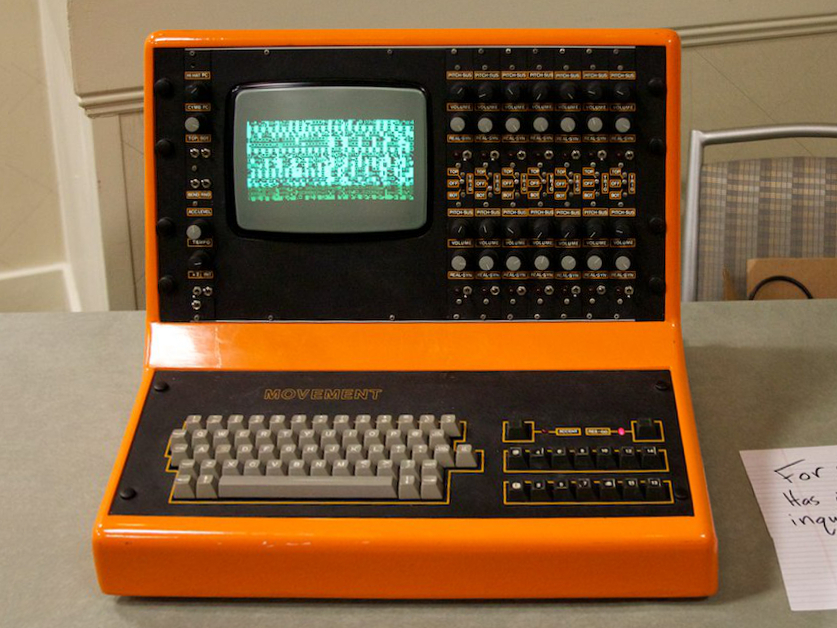
Stewart used a Movement Systems Drum Computer which also makes an appearance in the music video

Also purchased with the bank loan was a £2000 Movement Systems Drum Computer, one of only about 30 built, with the band having to sleep for a few days at the Bridgwater apartment of the manufacturer while their early prototype unit was being assembled. The MCS Drum Computer provided drum sounds, and also triggered sequences on a Roland SH-101 synthesiser, used for the synth bass line. To fill out the complement of instruments, Lennox played a borrowed Oberheim OB-X for sustained string sounds. Their only microphone, a utilitarian model typically used for hi-hat, recorded all the acoustic parts, including tracking Lennox's vocals.

Stewart recalls he was in a manic mood while Lennox was depressed. Stewart was upbeat because he had just survived surgery on a punctured lung, and felt he had been given a new lease on life. Lennox was feeling low because of the poor results from past musical work. She perked up when she heard Stewart first experimenting with the song's bass line sequence. She "leapt off the floor" and started to fill in the song with the Oberheim synth.

According to Stewart, their record label RCA Records did not think the song was suitable as a single in the United States as it lacked a chorus. After a radio DJ in Cleveland kept playing the song, and it generated a strong local response, RCA released it in the US.

== Release ==
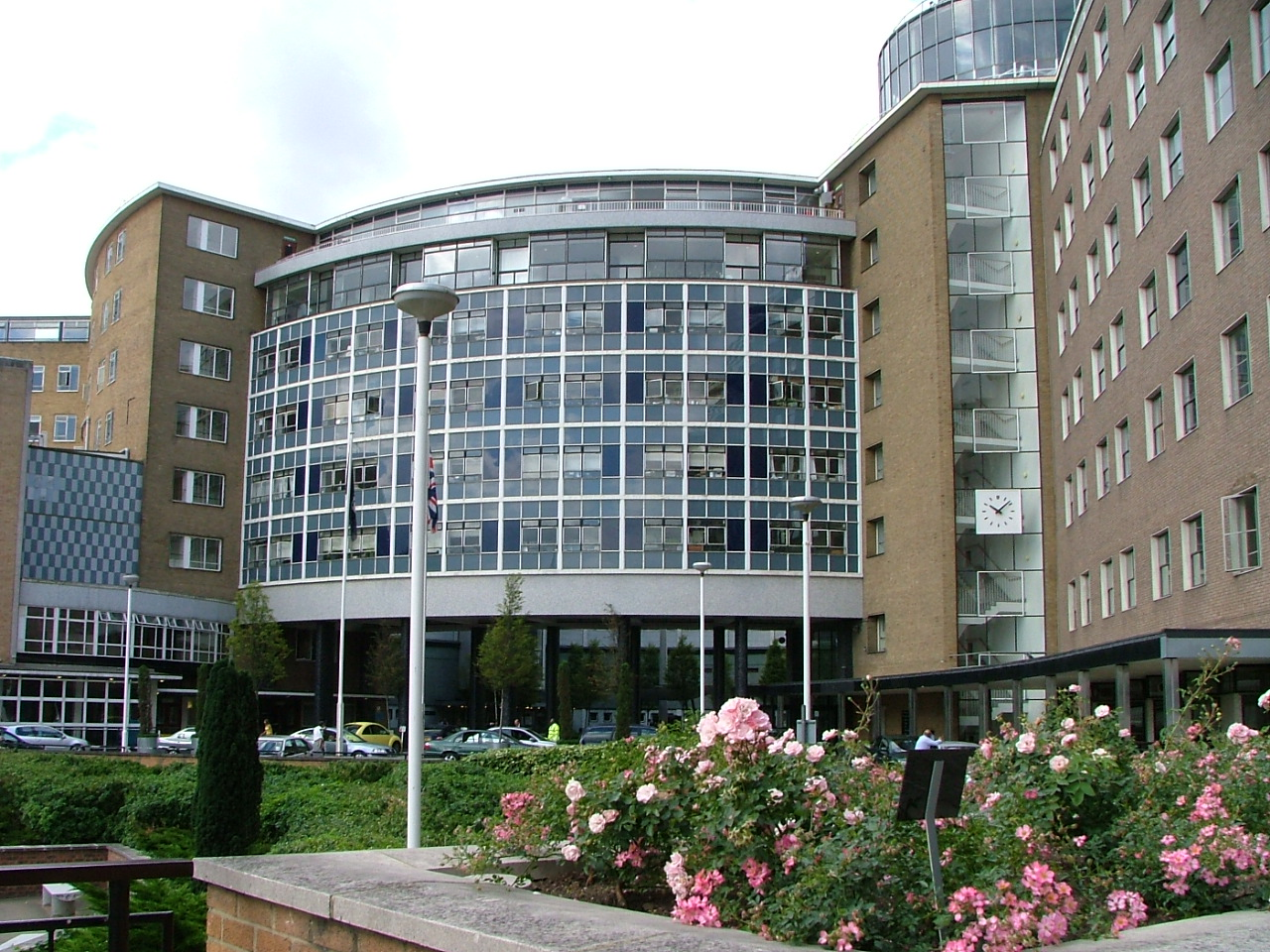
BBC Television Centre in London where Eurythmics performed the song on Top of the Pops in February 1983, and again in December 1983 for the show's Christmas special.

"Sweet Dreams (Are Made of This)" was released on 24 January 1983. It was Eurythmics' commercial breakthrough in the United Kingdom and all over the world. The single entered the UK singles chart at number 63 in February 1983 and reached number two the following month, spending a total of six weeks in the Top 5. The duo performed the song on the BBC's music chart show Top of the Pops on 24 February 1983 (when it was number 21 in the charts), and its continued climb up the charts saw them play it on the show's year end Christmas special. It was the 11th best-selling single of 1983 in the UK and has been certified quadruple platinum by the British Phonographic Industry.

"Sweet Dreams (Are Made of This)" was the first single released by Eurythmics in the United States when it was released around the end of April 1983. The single was issued in a special record sleeve by RCA. It debuted at number 90 on the Billboard Hot 100 in May and slowly eased up the chart. By August, the single had reached number two and stayed there for four weeks before it took the number one spot in the first week of September. The song also peaked at number one in Canada, and reached the top ten in a number of countries including Australia, West Germany, Spain and South Africa.

== Music video ==
"People went bonkers for the video, which was constantly on MTV. I wanted to make a commentary on the music business but also make something a bit performance art – weird and dreamlike. So we mocked up a record-company boardroom in a studio in Wardour Street and put a cow in it, to signify reality."

— Dave Stewart on making the music video.

The music video for "Sweet Dreams" was directed by London-based music video director Chris Ashbrook and filmed in January 1983, shortly before the single and the album were released. The boardroom scenes were filmed in a studio in Wardour Street, Soho in London's West End. The video received heavy airplay on the then-fledgling MTV channel and is widely considered a classic clip from the early-MTV era. Rolling Stone stated it "made Annie Lennox and Dave Stewart MTV superstars".

The video begins with a fist pounding on a table, with the camera panning up to reveal Lennox in a boardroom, with images of a Saturn V launch projected on a screen behind her, which are later replaced by a shot of a crowd walking down a street. Stewart is shown typing on a computer (actually an MCS drum computer). The camera cuts to Lennox and Stewart meditating on the table. Stewart is next shown playing cello in a field. The scene then returns to the boardroom, with Lennox and Stewart lying down on the table, and a cow walking around them. Stewart is shown again typing on the computer, with the cow feeding next to him. The scene cuts to the duo in a field, with a herd of cows, and Stewart still typing. Lennox and Stewart are then seen floating in a boat, with Stewart again playing the cello. The video ends with Lennox lying in bed, with the last shot being a book on a nightstand bearing a cover identical to the album. The screen then fades to black as Lennox turns off the bedside lamp.

We wanted our visual statements to be strong and powerful, because we knew they'd be there forever. I wore a suit in the video with my cropped hair. I was trying to be the opposite of the cliché of the female singer. I wanted to be as strong as a man, equal to Dave and perceived that way.

— Annie Lennox on her look in the video.

Lennox's androgynous visual image, with close-cropped, orange-coloured hair, and attired in a man's suit brandishing a cane, immediately made her a household name. The BBC stated her "powerful androgynous look" was the music video that "broke the mould for female pop stars". Her gender-bending image was also explored in other Eurythmics videos such as "Love Is a Stranger" and "Who's That Girl?" and with her appearance as Elvis Presley at the 1984 Grammy Awards.

== Critical reception ==
Contemporary reviews of "Sweet Dreams" were positive, with publications placing particular attention on Lennox's vocals. Record Business was complimentary of Lennox's "gutsy" vocal delivery and "bluesy wailing" and felt that the song was an effective follow-up to "Love is a Stranger". Record Mirror thought that the band created a successful hybrid of electronic blues and soul music with "Sweet Dreams". They also believed that Lennox's vocals were only rivaled by Alison Moyet of Yazoo. Billboard called the single "left-field but accessible".

Retrospectively, several publications have praised the song, with AllMusic deeming it one of the greatest showcases of new wave music. Slant Magazine placed the song on its list of the 100 Best Dance Songs and described it as "a triumph of computer programming" that featured "the single greatest use of a prolonged synth line in the history of dance music." Rolling Stone ranked the song number 356 on its 2003 edition of The 500 Greatest Songs of All Time. Ranking it the sixth greatest song of the 1980s, Neil McCormick, chief music critic for The Telegraph, writes, "It might just be the greatest synthesiser riff ever heard, a propulsive descending chord arpeggio that powers relentlessly forward over a thudding bass drum."

== Track listings ==
- 7-inch single

A: "Sweet Dreams (Are Made of This)" (LP Version) – 3:36
B: "I Could Give You a Mirror" (Alternate Version) – 4:15

- 12-inch single

A: "Sweet Dreams (Are Made of This)" (Extended Version) – 4:48
B1: "I Could Give You a Mirror" (Alternate Version) – 4:15
B2: "Baby's Gone Blue" (non-LP track) – 4:19

- 3-inch CD (1989 re-release)
1. "Sweet Dreams (Are Made of This)" (LP version) – 3:36
2. "I Could Give You a Mirror" (Alternate Version) – 4:15
3. "Here Comes the Rain Again" (LP Version) – 4:54
4. "Paint a Rumour" – 7:30
- CD single (1991 re-release)
1. "Sweet Dreams (Are Made of This) '91" (remixed by Giorgio Moroder) – 3:35
2. "Sweet Dreams (Are Made of This)" (Nightmare Remix) – (7:27)
3. "Sweet Dreams (Are Made of This)" (Hot Remix) (remixed by Giorgio Moroder) – 5:21
4. "Sweet Dreams (Are Made Of This)" (House Remix) (remixed by Giorgio Moroder) – 3:34
- Digital download
1. "Sweet Dreams (Are Made of This)" (Ummet Ozcan Remix) – 3:22
2. "Sweet Dreams (Are Made of This)" (Noisia Remix) – 6:02

== Credits and personnel ==
Credits sourced from Sound On Sound and Gearnews.

- Annie Lennox – lead and backing vocals, Oberheim OB-X synthesiser, piano
- David A. Stewart – Roland SH-101 synthesiser, Movement Systems drum computer programming

== Charts ==
=== Weekly charts ===
1983 weekly chart performance for "Sweet Dreams (Are Made of This)"
Chart (1983)	Peak position
Australia (Kent Music Report)	6
Austria (Ö3 Austria Top 40)	9
Belgium (Ultratop 50 Flanders)	3
Canada (The Record Retail Singles)	1
Canada Top Singles (RPM)	1
Finland (Suomen virallinen lista)	6
Iceland (Íslenski Listinn)	1
Ireland (IRMA)	2
Japan (Oricon)	89
Netherlands (Dutch Top 40)	9
Netherlands (Single Top 100)	10
New Zealand (Recorded Music NZ)	2
South Africa (Springbok Radio)	5
Spain (AFYVE)	3
Switzerland (Schweizer Hitparade)	8
UK Singles (Official Charts)	2
US Billboard Hot 100	1
US Adult Contemporary (Billboard)	36
US Dance Club Songs (Billboard)	2
US Mainstream Rock Airplay (Billboard)	16
US Cash Box Top 100	1
West Germany (GfK)	4

1991 weekly chart performance for "Sweet Dreams (Are Made of This)"
Chart (1991)	Peak position
UK Singles (Official Charts)	48
UK Dance (Music Week)	36
UK Club Chart (Record Mirror)	46

1995 weekly chart performance for "Sweet Dreams (Are Made of This)"
Chart (1995)	Peak position
UK Singles (OCC)	136

2010 weekly chart performance for "Sweet Dreams (Are Made of This)"
Chart (2010)	Peak position
UK Singles (OCC)	150

2020 weekly chart performance for "Sweet Dreams (Are Made of This)"
Chart (2020)	Peak position
Poland Airplay (ZPAV)	37

2022–2024 weekly chart performance for "Sweet Dreams (Are Made of This)"
Chart (2022–2024)	Peak position
France (SNEP)	143
Global 200 (Billboard)	138

2026 weekly chart performance
Chart (2026)	Peak position
Netherlands Airplay (Radiomonitor)	48

Weekly chart performance for "Sweet Dreams (Are Made of This)" (Steve Angello remix)
Chart (2005–2006)	Peak position
CIS Airplay (TopHit)	37
France (SNEP)	27
Russia Airplay (TopHit)	42

=== Year-end charts ===
1983 year-end chart performance for "Sweet Dreams (Are Made of This)"
Chart (1983)	Position
Australia (Kent Music Report)	41
Belgium (Ultratop 50 Flanders)	54
Canada Top Singles (RPM)	7
Netherlands (Single Top 100)	90
New Zealand (Recorded Music NZ)	15
UK Singles (Gallup)	11
US Billboard Hot 100	10
US Dance Club Songs (Billboard)	31
US Cash Box Top 100	14
West Germany (Official German Charts)	21

2019 year-end chart performance for "Sweet Dreams (Are Made of This)"
Chart (2019)	Position
Poland (ZPAV)	98

2024 year-end chart performance for "Sweet Dreams (Are Made of This)"
Chart (2024)	Position
France (SNEP)	162

Year-end chart performance
Chart (2025)	Position
Argentina Anglo Airplay (Monitor Latino)	82

Year-end chart performance for "Sweet Dreams (Are Made of This)" (Steve Angello remix)
Chart (2006)	Position
Russia Airplay (TopHit)	169

== Certifications ==
Region	Certification	Certified units/sales
Canada (Music Canada)	Gold	50,000^{^}
Denmark (IFPI Danmark)	2× Platinum	180,000^{‡}
France (SNEP)	Gold	500,000^{*}
Germany (BVMI)	3× Gold	900,000^{‡}
Italy (FIMI)	2× Platinum	200,000^{‡}
New Zealand (RMNZ)	5× Platinum	150,000^{‡}
Spain (Promusicae)	2× Platinum	120,000^{‡}
United Kingdom (BPI)	4× Platinum	2,400,000^{‡}
United States (RIAA)	Gold	1,000,000^{^}
^{*} Sales figures based on certification alone.^{^} Shipments figures based on certification alone.^{‡} Sales+streaming figures based on certification alone.

== Cover versions ==
=== Swing featuring Dr. Alban version ===
"Sweet Dreams"

Single by Swing featuring Dr. Alban
- B-side: "Remix"
- Released: 1995
- Studio: Dr. Records Studio
- Genre: Eurodance
- Length: 3:28
- Label: Cheiron
- Producers: F. Lokar; V. Salazar

Swing featuring Dr. Alban singles chronology
"Let the Beat Go On" (1994)	"Sweet Dreams" (1995)	"This Time I'm Free" (1995)

In 1995, American rapper and singer Swing (aka Richard Silva II) released a dance cover of "Sweet Dreams" featuring the Sweden-based musician and producer Dr. Alban. The female singer in the song is Swedish singer Birgitta Edoff. Alban produced the single after Swing was signed to his label, Dr. Records. This version was a major hit in Europe, peaking at number four in Finland, number nine in Denmark, number 12 in Sweden, and number 44 in the Netherlands. In the UK, the track reached number 59.

==== Critical reception ====
Pan-European magazine Music & Media commented, "Nomen est omen; indeed it's a cover of Eurythmics' first hit. Also, what Swing promises is what you get. It's heavily Eurofied with the Swedish rap specialist cutting his teeth on it." Alan Jones from Music Week wrote, "From Sweden, Swing featuring Dr. Alban offer a bludgeoning techno version dominated by rap, with occasional reprises of the title line by Birgitta Edoff". James Hamilton from the RM Dance Update described it as a "cheesier cornily rapped Swedish remake".

==== Track listings ====
12" single, Sweden (1995)
No.	Title	Length
1.	"Sweet Dreams" (Aura Mix)	6:07
2.	"Sweet Dreams" (Extended Mix)	6:00
3.	"Sweet Dreams" (Tabledance Mix)	5:41
4.	"Sweet Dreams" (Radio Mix)	3:28

CD single, Germany (1995)
No.	Title	Length
1.	"Sweet Dreams" (Radio)	3:28
2.	"Sweet Dreams" (Extended)	6:00

CD maxi, Europe (1995)
No.	Title	Length
1.	"Sweet Dreams" (Radio)	3:28
2.	"Sweet Dreams" (Extended)	6:00
3.	"Sweet Dreams" (Aura Mix)	6:07
4.	"Sweet Dreams" (Tabledance)	5:41

==== Charts ====
Chart (1995)	Peak position
Denmark (IFPI)	9
Europe (European Dance Radio)	15
Finland (Suomen virallinen lista)	4
Netherlands (Dutch Top 40 Tip)	2
Netherlands (Single Top 100)	44
Scottish Singles Sales (Official Charts)	91
Sweden (Sverigetopplistan)	12
UK Singles (Official Charts)	59
UK Pop Tip Club Chart (Music Week)	4

=== Marilyn Manson version ===
"Sweet Dreams (Are Made of This)"

Single by Marilyn Manson

from the album Smells Like Children
- Released: 1995
- Genre: Industrial rock; hard rock; gothic rock; heavy metal
- Length: 4:25 (single edit); 4:53 (album version)
- Label: Nothing; Interscope
- Songwriters: Annie Lennox; David A. Stewart
- Producers: Marilyn Manson; Trent Reznor

Marilyn Manson singles chronology
"Lunchbox" (1995)	"Sweet Dreams (Are Made of This)" (1995)	"The Beautiful People" (1996)

Audio sample
- "Sweet Dreams (Are Made of This)": file; help

Music video
- "Sweet Dreams (Are Made of This)" on YouTube

Marilyn Manson released a cover version as the first single from Smells Like Children (1995), an EP of covers, remixes and interludes. In his 1998 autobiography, the band's eponymous vocalist said he fought then-label Interscope Records to have this track released as a single, saying: "They didn't want to release [it], which I knew would be a song that even people who didn't like our band would like. [Nothing] wanted to release our version of Screamin' Jay Hawkins' 'I Put a Spell on You', which was far too dark, sprawling and esoteric, even for some of our own fans. We battled the label this time, and learned we could win. ... It was a disheartening experience, but it didn't hurt half as much as the fact that no one at our label ever congratulated us on the success of the song."

The track became the band's first legitimate hit. The music video was directed by American photographer Dean Karr, and was shot near downtown Los Angeles. It featured images of the vocalist self-mutilating while wearing a tutu, as well as scenes of him riding a pig. It was placed on heavy rotation on MTV, and was nominated for Best Rock Video at the 1996 MTV Video Music Awards. In 2010, Billboard rated it the "scariest music video ever made", beating Michael Jackson's "Thriller". The video also appeared at number three in the publication's 2013 list of "The 15 Scariest Music Videos Ever". Dave Stewart has said that he liked this version of his song, and that "the video was one of the scariest things [he]'d seen at the time." As of 2020, the track has sold 80,000 copies through digital retailers in the United Kingdom, where it is also the band's most streamed music video, generating almost twelve million audio and video streams.

The song went on to appear on the band's 2004 greatest hits album, Lest We Forget: The Best Of. It also featured on soundtracks to the films Enron: The Smartest Guys in the Room (2005), Gamer (2009), and A Perfect Day (2015), in movies such as House on Haunted Hill (1999), and Trick 'r Treat (2007), as well as the trailer for Wrath of the Titans (2012), in the pilot episode of The Following, on the BBC drama Luther, and the Nature three-part miniseries "Okavango: River of Dreams". Britney Spears created a music video using Manson's version of the song. This video – also directed by Chris Ashbrook – was used as an interlude on her 2009 concert tour The Circus Starring Britney Spears.

==== Track listing ====
- CD single
1. "Sweet Dreams (Are Made of This)" – 4:25
2. "Dance of the Dope Hats" (Remix by Anthony Valcic, Dave Ogilvie and Joseph Bishara) – 4:46
3. "Down in the Park" (Gary Numan cover) – 4:58
4. "Lunchbox (Next Motherfucker)" (Remix by Charlie Clouser) – 4:47

==== Charts ====
Chart (1996)	Peak position
Australia (ARIA)	28
Canada Rock/Alternative (RPM)	12
New Zealand (Recorded Music NZ)	50
UK Singles (OCC)	135
US Alternative Airplay (Billboard)	26
US Mainstream Rock Airplay (Billboard)	31

Chart (2012)	Peak position
France (SNEP)	154

==== Certifications ====
Region	Certification	Certified units/sales
Italy (FIMI)	Gold	50,000^{‡}
New Zealand (RMNZ)	Platinum	30,000^{‡}
United Kingdom (BPI)	Silver	200,000^{‡}
^{‡} Sales+streaming figures based on certification alone.

=== JX Riders featuring Skylar Stecker version ===
In 2016, JX Riders featuring Skylar Stecker went to number one on the US dance chart with their version.

==== Weekly charts ====
Chart (2016)	Peak position
US Dance Club Songs (Billboard)	1

==== Year-end charts ====
Chart (2016)	Position
US Dance Club Songs (Billboard)	16

== See also ==
- List of Billboard Hot 100 number-one singles of 1983
