= Roland MC-202 =

Synthesizer and sequencer

MC-202 MicroComposer
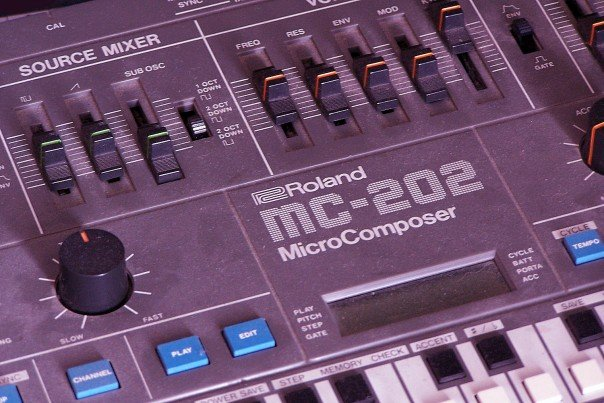
- Roland MC-202
- Manufacturer: Roland
- Dates: 1983–1985
- Price: $595

Technical specifications
- Polyphony: Monophonic
- Timbrality: Monotimbral
- Oscillator: 1 VCO
- LFO: 1 sine
- Synthesis type: Analog Subtractive
- Filter: 1 resonant lowpass
- Attenuator: 1 ADSR
- Aftertouch expression: No
- Velocity expression: No
- Storage memory: 2 tracks
- Effects: None

Input/output
- Keyboard: 2 1/2 oct rubber buttons
- External control: CV/gate, DIN sync

The Roland MC-202 (MicroComposer) is a monophonic analog synthesizer and music sequencer released by Roland in 1983. It was the first groovebox. Its synth is similar to the TB-303 bass synth and the SH-101 synthesizer, featuring one voltage-controlled oscillator with simultaneous saw and square/pulse-width waveforms. It is a successor to the Microcomposer family of sequencers, including the MC-8 and MC-4. The unit is portable and can be operated from batteries or an external power supply.

== Synthesizer ==
The internal synthesizer features one voltage-controlled oscillator with simultaneous saw, square/pulse-width and sub-octave square waveforms. Additionally there is a 24dB Low Pass filter, an LFO and a single ADSR envelope generator.

In terms of circuitry, it is nearly identical to the earlier SH-101 synthesizers but lacks the noise generator, choice of LFO shapes and modulation/pitch bend controls. However, unlike the SH-101, it does include a delay on the LFO. The two units also share a design aesthetic in terms of the control layout, casing, lettering, knobs and slider caps.

== Sequencer ==
An example track using the MC-202
Small looped example using the built-in sequencer, filter and controls; no additional effects.

another example track using the MC-202
Simple song arrangement using Roland's MC-202 for the filter hookline, SH-101 for the bass and TR-808 for drums; no additional effects.

The MC-202 includes a sequencer that can play back two separate sequences simultaneously. Two sets of CV/Gate connectors on the rear of the unit allow for routing the sequences to external synthesizers. One of the two sequences is used to control the internal synthesiser. The sequencer is programmed much like Roland's early digital MC-4 and MC-8 Microcomposer sequencers, whereby notes are entered with pitch, length and gate length. Additionally, each note in the sequence can have an accent and slide, which is similar to the TB-303 and allows for so called acid sequences. The SH-101 lacks the ability to program accents.

The sequences are lost if the unit is powered down, however a tape interface is provided so that sequences can be stored to and recalled from an audio tape recorder.

There are DIN sync inputs and outputs which allow the unit to synchronise playback, either as master or slave, with other DIN sync-equipped instruments such as the TB-303 or the Roland TR-808. The unit can also generate and sync to frequency-shift keying signals from a tape recorder. The MC-303 was built in 1996 and is a digital successor of the MC-202.

== Computer-based sequencer programming ==
In 1997, Defective Records Software released MC-202 Hack, a software application that enables programming of the MC-202's sequencer on computer. It works by creating audio that is routed into the MC-202's cassette input port. It allows for MIDI files to be converted to MC-202 sequences. This eliminates the need to use the MC-202 keys to enter sequence information. Version 2 of the software (released in 2009) also allows sequences programmed directly on the MC-202 to be converted back into MIDI files.
