= Roland MC-909 =

Combines the features of a synthesizer, sequencer, and sampler

Roland MC-909 sampling groovebox
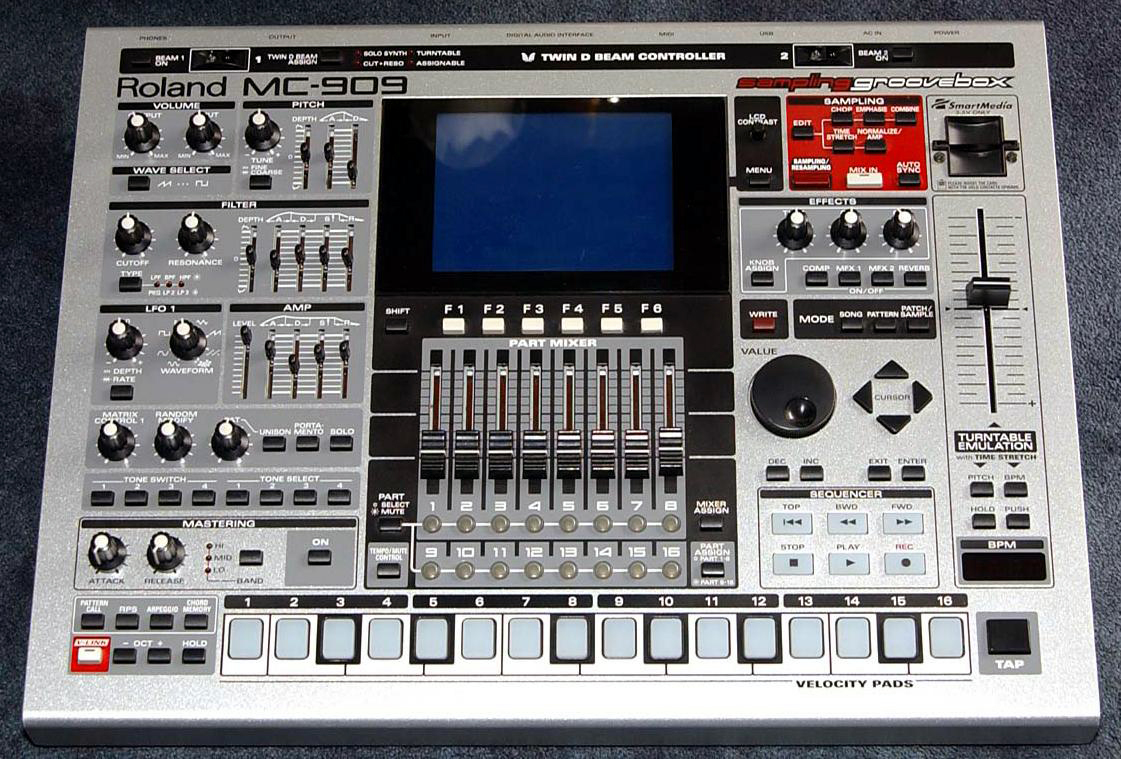
- Manufacturer: Roland
- Dates: 2002–2006; OS: v1.23 (Final Version)
- Price: £1156 UK, $1795 US

Technical specifications
- Polyphony: 64-note
- Timbrality: 16-part
- Oscillator: Yes
- LFO: Yes
- Synthesis type: sampler (rompler)
- Filter: Yes
- Storage memory: 16 MB; expandable to 272 MB; ROM: 800 patches, 72 rhythm sets, RAM: 256 patches, 128 rhythm sets, Smartmedia cards
- Effects: reverb–delay, chorus–flanger

Input/output
- Keyboard: No
- External control: MIDI in/out, USB

The discontinued Roland MC-909 Sampling Groovebox combines the features of a synthesizer, sequencer, and sampler, with extensive hands-on control of both the sound engine and the sequencing flow. It was intended primarily for live performance of pre-programmed patterns consisting of up to 16 tracks of MIDI data. It was released by Roland Corporation on October 8, 2002. This product was announced at the AES Fall Convention in 2002. It is the direct successor to the Roland MC-505 and is the predecessor to the Roland MC-808. Which eventually ended the "Groovebox by year 2010" line of products by Roland which began in the year 1996 with the Original Roland MC-303 groovebox. The Roland Groovebox began again resurgence in the year 2019 with a two new modern & redesign Roland MC-707 GROOVEBOX/Roland MC-101 GROOVEBOX. The Roland MC-909 was developed from the blueprint of Roland's own "Roland Fantom-S Workstation & Roland Fantom-X Workstation" and uses the same structure and operating system, with some differences regarding the Patterns section, not implemented in the Roland Fantom S/X6/X7/X8 Workstation.

== Sound generation ==
The MC-909 has a ROM-based sound generator (sometimes referred to as a rompler.) Its patches are built from up to four tones. The tones are based on waves stored in the machine. Patches can also utilize user-created samples. Roland's literature states that the MC-909 has "new-generation XV synthesis", the synth in the MC-909 is a very similar sound engine to that of the XV-5050 64-Voice Synthesizer Module. The number of PCM waveforms is 693, ranging from vintage synths to strings, drums, guitars and pianos. It can be expanded by adding one SRX card* from 12 different cards available.

- *Note: [If you choose the Roland SRX-05 "Supreme Dance" expansion card, you'll get special Patches that can only be accessed on the MC-909.]

The MC-909 is always in sequencer mode, as opposed to other workstations that have also a simple Voice or Combination mode for straight playing. Straight playing via an external keyboard is however possible directly from the sequencer mode by simply selecting one of the 16 tracks (parts) where a patch (voice, sound) is stored. In this case the MC-909 performs as a regular, 16-part multitimbral sound module, that happens to have a sequencer, too. In essence, the MC-909 can be used as a very capable sound module without ever needing to fire up its sequencer.

The MC-909 is the first Roland groovebox to feature a sampler. It can record audio from any of the external audio inputs, SPDIF connectors, or import wav and aiff files from a computer using a USB port. The sampler can be upgraded up to a total of 272 MB RAM (16 MB User + 256 MB PC-100 or PC-133 168-Pin DIMM Module), and the samples can also be stored on a 128 MB 3.3 volt Smartmedia card. The unit is also able to store on two 128 MB Smartmedia cards if there is more than 256 MB DATA in its user memory. There are tricks from user forum sites that have found ways to go beyond this limitation using xD-Picture Cards as other means for storage.

== Sequencer ==
The MC-909's sequencer is based on pattern composition. Each pattern has 16 tracks (parts) and can have up to 999 measures (bars). The "pattern" in the groovebox concept as developed by Roland (and thence adopted by other manufacturers) is intended to be a 4-to-16 bars-long small musical phrase made up of 8 to 16 tracks. The chaining of several patterns together (with seamless passage between one another) will create a full song, or the patterns can be looped as wanted and messed with using the on-board real-time controls.

In the MC-909 the storage capacity of the sequencer makes the patterns capable of storing almost 1000 bars, and 16 tracks.

Each of the 16 parts (tracks) is set to a specific patch, with its own mixer settings (pan, volume, key, effect, routing, and so on). There are a variety of editing modes: The main modes allow real-time recording, step recording and TR-REC recording. In step recording, notes or chords can be added one at a time. In TR-REC mode, each of the 16 pads represents a point along a musical measure. This speeds up the entry of percussion tracks. Patterns can be strung together into "songs", which, in fact, are mislabelled, merely being chains of patterns played in a specific order. In fact, there is no recording or sequencing capability in Song mode besides pattern chaining and some playback settings.

The sequencer can load Standard MIDI Files (albeit with some workarounds to avoid loading bugs that have never been fixed) and play them back. Additionally, the sequencer will also include samples stored into its memory in the pattern tracks.

== Features ==
- Sound generator with 64 note - voice polyphony
- 16-track sequencer+Tempo/Mute Ctrl Track
- 16MB sample memory (expandable to 272 MB max.)
- SmartMedia card handling (8-128 MB) to store audio and midi files and backup (16MB)
- Effects generator (24-bit reverb, two multi-effects processors, compression/EQ and mastering effects)
- Large LCD screen
- Expandable with SRX-series wave expansion boards, SmartMedia cards (smf, wav)
- USB port for MIDI and transfer of data (full duplex) and for remote editing (groovemanager)
- S/PDIF input and output plus coaxial I/O (digital)
- Line In with selectable sources (line in, mic) for sampling, re-sampling
- Dual D-Beam controllers (solosynth, cut+reso, turntable, assignable)
- Turntable emulation (pitch control, BPM control, hold, push)
- Velocity sensitive pads
- V-LINK connecting audio & video in performance

== Users ==
The Roland MC-909 was used by the hip hop producer RZA while working on the movies Blade: Trinity and Kill Bill. RZA uses many Roland products including the Roland Fantom, MV-8000 & Roland MV-8800. Another artist that uses the Roland MC-909 is Switchfoot keyboardist Jerome Fontamillas for live setups.

== Criticisms ==
The Roland MC-909 received good reviews at tech magazines like Future Music and Sound on Sound. However, it faced serious competition from the equally powerful Yamaha RS7000. Many MC-909 users complained about several operating system bugs at the Yahoo! Groups forum and also Roland Clan Forums. In fact, even when the machine was released in 2002, it took Roland Corporation 5 years until some of the more complex bugs (like the inability to store RPS patterns) were fixed in the operating system upgrade v1.23 in early 2007. Another common complaint refers to the unit's size, which makes it less portable than a laptop with a midi controller. The unit has been designed with only a 2-prong power inlet, without a ground lift; hence, there have been complaints of light electrical discharges from its metallic body when handled with less-than-dry hands.

Further criticism pointed out the uneven volume ranges of its voices, waveforms and sounds. Additionally, critics noted that, for a machine aimed at the dance/techno/electronica market, the sound engine was excessively rich in sounds from ethnic, classical and band instruments.

The sampler, although powerful, has a very complex access-and-editing route and lacks the ability to set keyboard ranges for different samples, making it difficult to create realistic sounds from a set of multisamples. There is, however, a work-around for this via an external editor on the PC & Mac called: MC-909 Editor Update v3.1, that is freely available for download at this site.

The inputs, used for either sampling or sound processing of an external sound source, are routed through the effects engine and heard at the outputs during real-time. However, re-sampling is necessary in order for the sample to contain the effects as a part of the sample. Following any re-sampling, the sample playback can be further re-sampled or processed by more effects at the outputs during playback.

The Roland MC-909 is no longer in production by Roland Corporation. The Roland MC-909 is consequently called to become a cult item, as Mellotron or the TB-303. While no longer in production, the MC-909 can be bought these days second-hand at places like eBay, with a typical second-hand purchase price, as of 2021, around US$1000. The original MSRP price set by Roland in 2002 was US$1,795.99.

== Unsolved bugs ==
Several operating system bugs were gradually solved over time; the last operating system upgrade (Version 1.23) was introduced on March 30, 2007.

The current unsolved problems at the present moment are:

- It is not possible to load a Standard Midi File or other sequence file from a card to internal memory onto an existing pattern without initializing all the existing pattern's settings back to basic format. In order to load a SMF onto a pattern and retain that pattern's settings, the SMF must be first loaded onto an unused or empty location within internal memory, then moved to the wanted location with the Copy function.
- Many users complain that there is no sustain in Song Mode, resulting in a noticeable audio gapping between patterns. This is most noticeable at slower tempos. (Although different Machine, see also: MC-808 Roland MC-808#Unresolved issues)
- Even when a part is set to EXT, the internal sound engine will continue to produce sounds. You can work this around by assigning a blank patch to that part; however, this is not the expected behaviour described in the manual.
- Going into MENU (e.g. USB transfer) resets the 909 to Preset Pattern 1 when you come out of menu.
- Tracks 6 and 13 will not mute/unmute when pressed at the same time (introduced in v1.22)

There are current unresolved issues with the implementation of effects when switching patterns, but the MC-909 was "designed by specification". Roland might refer to the end users' requests for effects that sustain past the point when the pattern switches as they "developing a future new product".

The last operating system upgrade (Version 1.23), corrected few issue with:

- RPS Setting, RPS Mixer WRITE editor of the contents of operation does not save a fixed point.
- Import BMP features and functionality Realtime Erase fixed.
- Song editing function has been strengthened.
- Sounds & Effects strengthened, Stable for tuning various countries. (Roland Corp. Japan Trans: MC-909 VER. History List )
