= Roland JX-305 =

Digital synthesizer

JX-305 "Groovesynth"
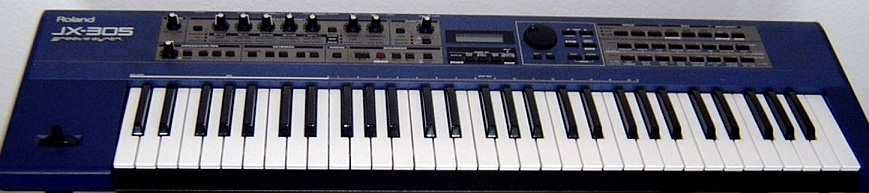
- A purple JX-305.
- Manufacturer: Roland
- Dates: 1998–2002

Technical specifications
- Polyphony: 64
- Timbrality: 8-part multitimbral
- LFO: Triangle, sine, sawtooth, square, trapezoid, S&H, random, chaos
- Synthesis type: Sample-based synthesis (rompler)
- Filter: Digital. Low-pass filter, band-pass, hi-pass, peaking.
- Attenuator: Yes
- Aftertouch expression: Yes
- Effects: reverb/delay, chorus/flanger

Input/output
- Keyboard: 61-key piano-style keyboard
- Left-hand control: Pitch bend
- External control: MIDI in/out

The Roland JX-305 synthesizer was produced in 1998 by Roland. It is very similar to a Roland MC-505 with a piano keyboard added onto it. It is sensitive to velocity and has channel aftertouch. This keyboard was aimed at producers of dance and trance music and was also popular for live performances during the late 1990s. The synth has nine MIDI control knobs and a two-line LCD.
