= Téo & Téa =

Studio album by Jean-Michel Jarre
- Released: 2007
- Length: 50:30
- Label: Warner Music
- Producer: Jean Michel Jarre

Jean-Michel Jarre chronology
Sublime Mix (2006)	Téo & Téa (2007)	Oxygène: New Master Recording (2007)

Professional ratings
Review scores
Source	Rating
AllMusic	3.5/5 stars
The Guardian	1/5 stars
Indie London	3.5/5 stars

Téo & Téa is the sixteenth studio album by French electronic musician and composer Jean-Michel Jarre, released in 2007 on Aero Productions and Warner Music labels. Two singles were released, the first, "Téo & Téa", as a promotional for clubs and radio stations and then as a general release. The second, "Vintage", was released in digital download format only, on July 16, 2007, and included two remixes by ATB.

The album describes the different stages of a loving relationship, and explores the idea that the length of such relationships is unpredictable. Its release demonstrated a move away from virtual instruments and computers that Jarre had been using up to that point; he instead chose to use a simplified range of devices, including several new prototype instruments. The album's cover was inspired by the David Lynch film Wild at Heart. Jarre's then-wife, Anne Parillaud, provided wailing to the track "Beautiful Agony".

== Release ==
The album was released on CD in 2007 by Aero Productions and Warner Music labels. It was also released with a bonus DVD which features the same tracks mixed for 5.1 surround sound, as well as the video clip for the title track in high-definition, viewable on personal computers. The two computer-generated characters which appeared in the video clip of the title track are "like twins", one is male and one is female.

== Critical reception ==
The Guardian writer Dave Simpson described the album melodies as "infantile", commenting that they "sound like a music-shop demonstration room in 1979". IndieLondon described the opening number as "incredibly lively...sets the tone for the tracks that follow." Thom Jurek of AllMusic wrote "he may be retro but he's far from tired".

== Track listing ==
All tracks are written by Jean-Michel Jarre.

No.	Title	Length
1.	"Fresh News"	2:42
2.	"Téo & Téa"	3:37
3.	"Beautiful Agony"	4:38
4.	"Touch to Remember"	6:07
5.	"OK, Do It Fast"	3:23
6.	"Partners in Crime 1"	3:38
7.	"Partners in Crime 2"	3:33
8.	"Chatterbox"	2:14
9.	"In the Mood for You"	4:18
10.	"Gossip"	2:09
11.	"Vintage"	3:04
12.	"Melancholic Rodeo"	3:46
13.	"Téo & Téa 4:00 AM"	7:06
Total length:		50:30

== Personnel ==
Personnel listed in album liner notes:

- Jean-Michel Jarre – keyboards, synthesizers and drum programming: Korg Radias, Moog Voyager, Roland MC-808, Roland Fantom-X-8, Roland V-Synth, Access Virus, SH-201, Pro Tools HD3; vocals (Vocoder-filtered) on "In the Mood for You"
- Claude Samard – string arrangements, guitars, programming, Cubase, Digital Performer, Pro Tools HD3
- Francis Rimbert – keyboards and synthesizers: Roland Fantom-X8, V-Synth, Pro Tools Digi002
- Tim Hüfken – Groove Box special programming and artistic collaboration: Roland MC-808 Groovebox and Sonar Sequencer
- Bertrand Lajaudie – additional programming
- Anne Parillaud – additional vocals on "Beautiful Agony"

== Charts ==
Chart (2007)	Peak position
French Albums (SNEP)	8
Dutch Albums (Album Top 100)	46
Swiss Albums (Schweizer Hitparade)	43
Belgian Albums (Ultratop Wallonia)	9
Belgian Albums (Ultratop Flanders)	53
Hungarian Albums (MAHASZ)	8
UK Albums (OCC)	103
Italian Albums (FIMI)	84
Spanish Albums (Promusicae)	45
