= Roland D2 =

D2
- Manufacturer: Roland Corporation
- Dates: 2001

Technical specifications
- Polyphony: 64 note
- Timbrality: 23 parts, 7 main +1 rhythm of 8 parts + 8 rps parts
- Storage memory: 600 preset patches, 256 user patches, 30 drumkits, 20 user drumkits, 157 preset patterns, 100 user patterns, 43 arpeggiator presets, 10 user arpeggiator sets, 232 RPS (Realtime Phrase Sequence) part phrases, 30 user RPS, 20 user pattern-sets, 20 user megamix sets, 25 user songs, + 40,000 notes on the user.
- Effects: reverb, Delay, MFX

Input/output
- External control: MIDI in/out

The Roland D2 Groovebox is a performance-oriented Groovebox (sequencer/sound module). It has Roland's D-Field Controller technology. It has all of the Roland MC-505 sounds and a similar sequencer. All of the MFX effects have sub-menus. The D2 has 100+ sub-menus to sub-sub-sub-menus, and this is why it has fewer buttons than other Grooveboxes.

It is a compact, performance-oriented Groovebox (sequencer/sound module)--sort of a smaller MC-505—designed entirely around Roland's D-Field Controller technology. It has realtime and step record modes. It has the megamix option, which is a complicated but nice feature.

This Groovebox was designed entirely around Roland's D-Field Controller technology. The touch-sensitive pad in the center allows the user to program and modify patterns, sounds and effects. The D-Field controller offers 3 modes – Sounds, XY and Spin, which makes it an interesting device for real-time based performance. It takes its 600 preset patches and 30 preset drum kits from the MC-505 and also features a similar sequencer with 150 new preset patterns.

== Features ==
mfx = 4band eq, spectrum, enhancer, overdrive, distortion, lo-fi, noise, radio tuning, phonograph, compressor, limiter, slicer, tremolo, phaser, chorus, space-d, tetra chorus, flanger, step flanger, short delay, auto pan, fb pitch shifter, reverb, gate reverb, isolator reverb = room 1, 2, stage 1, 2, hall 1,2, time, bypass 200 (Hz) 8.00 (kHz), level delay = short, long, 200 (hz) 8.00 (kHz) bypass, feedback arpeggiator = x2, style 43, motif 20, beat pattern, shuffle rate, accent rate, octave range, octave shift.
