= SRX expansion board =

Expansion board for Roland synthesizers

SRX-07 Ultimate Keys board.

The SRX are a series of expansion boards produced by Roland Corporation. First introduced in 2000, they are small boards of electronic circuitry with 32MB PCM chip-ROMs (decompressed to 64MB) containing patches (timbres) and rhythm sets (drum kits). They are used to expand certain models of Roland synthesizers, music workstations, keyboards, and sound modules.

Predecessor formats include the 15 SN-U110 PCM cards (U-110, U-20, U-220, D-70, CM-64 and CM-32P), 8 SL-JD80 PCM card/preset RAM card (JD-only) sets and 8 SO-PCM1 1-2 MB cards (both JD-800, JD-990, JV-80, JV-880, JV-90, JV-1000 and JV-1080), 22 SR-JV80 (aka "SR-JV") expansion boards (JD-990, JV-880, JV-1010, JV-1080, JV-2080, XV-3080, XV-5080, JV-80, JV-90, JV-1000, XP-30, XP-50, XP-60, XP-80, Fantom FA76, XV-88) and others.

The Roland INTEGRA-7 Rack synthesizer included the data of 12 loadable SRX-Boards from SRX-01 to SRX-12, with a choice of between zero and maximum four virtual SRX-boards available simultaneously, depending of other PCM data loaded.

== Expansion boards ==
- SRX-01 Dynamic Drum Kits
- SRX-02 Concert Piano
- SRX-03 Studio SRX
- SRX-04 Symphonique Strings
- SRX-05 Supreme Dance
- SRX-06 Complete Orchestra - SR-JV80 Collection Vol. 1
- SRX-07 Ultimate Keys - SR-JV80 Collection Vol. 2
- SRX-08 Platinum Trax - SR-JV80 Collection Vol. 3
- SRX-09 World Collection - SR-JV80 Collection Vol. 4
- SRX-10 Big Brass Ensemble (early 2004)
- SRX-11 Complete Piano (late 2004)
- SRX-12 Classic EPs (2006)
- SRX-96 World Collection and Legendary XP Essentials - Special SRX Board 2008
- SRX-97 Jon Lord's Rock Organ - Special SRX Board 2007
- SRX-98 Analog Essentials - Special SRX Board 2006 (not listed as compatible with then-available XV-3080/88)
- SRX-99 Special Wave Expansion (promo released mid-2004)

== Compatible hosts ==
According to Roland, the following products accept SRX expansion boards.

=== SR-JV80 BOARDS ONLY ===
==== Keyboards ====
Model	SR-JV Slots
JV-80	1
JV-90	1
JV-1000	1
XP-30	2
XP-50	4
XP-60	4
XP-80	4

==== Synth Modules ====
Model	SR-JV Slots
JV-880	1
JD-990	1
JV-1010	1
JV-1080	4
JV-2080	8

=== BOTH SR-JV80 and SRX BOARDS ===
==== Keyboards ====
Model	SR-JV Slots	SRX Slots
Fantom FA76	1	2
XV-88	2	2

==== Synth Modules ====
Model	SR-JV Slots	SRX Slots
XV-3080	4	2
XV-5080	4	4

=== SRX BOARDS ONLY ===
==== Keyboards ====
Model	SRX Slots
RD-700 (2004)	2
RD-700SX (2005)	2
RD-700GX (2008)	2
Fantom S/S88 (2003)	4
Fantom X6/X7/X8/Xa (2004)	4
Juno-G (2006)	1
Juno Stage (2008)	2
G-70 (2004)	1
E-80 (2006/2007)	2
VR-760 (2003)	2

==== Synth Modules ====
Model	SRX Slots
XV-5050	2
XV-2020	2
Fantom XR (2004)	6
Sonic Cell (2007)	2

==== Groove Box ====
Model	SRX Slots
MC-909	1

Some later SRX cards, for example the SRX96 and 97 do not work in the XV3080 host synthesizer module nor in the XV-88 keyboard synthesizer.
