= Movement Systems Drum Computer =

Drum machine

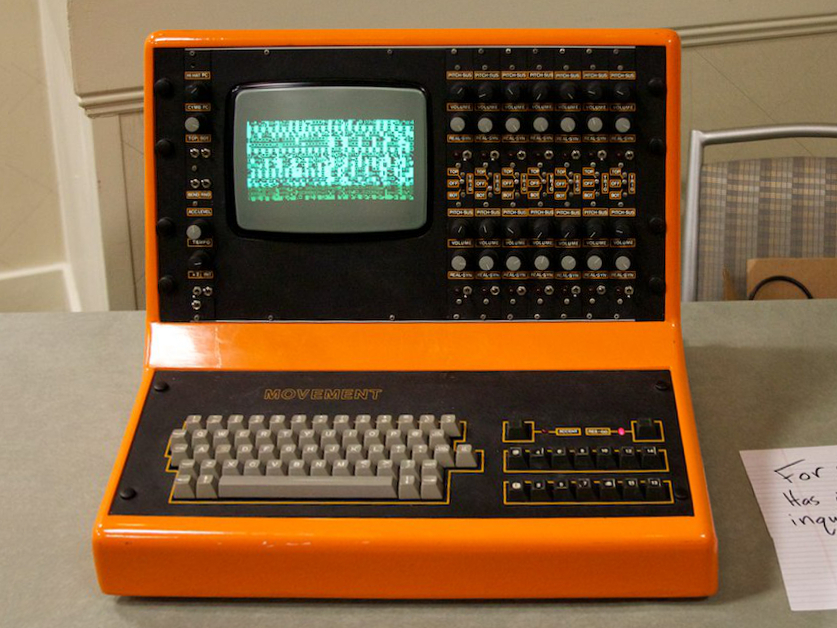
- Sir Ruff's Movement Drum Computer II at Knobcon 2014 with a garbled display caused by OS booting issues.
- Developer: John Dickenson; Dave Goodway
- Released: 1981 (MKI); 1983 (MKII)

The Movement Drum System I/II (generally referred to as the Movement MCS Percussion Computer) is a British-made drum machine produced approximately between 1981 (MKI) and 1983 (MKII). Around 10 MKI were built and 50 MKII. The Movement was exceptionally futuristic for its time. The Movement was used by Dave Stewart of Eurythmics on "Sweet Dreams (Are Made of This)"

== History ==
Both retailed at £1999 ex vat at March 1983 from 'Movement Audio Visual', 61 Taunton Road, Bridgwater, Somerset, TA6 3LP, UK. Both models combined two technologies; analogue synthesized drum sounds similar to Simmons SDSV and basic digital 8-bit drum samples. In total 14 independent voice modules could be played (5 of which can be digital). Also notable for its computer-like design and its ability to display drum notes and sequencing graphically on a green black cathode ray tube display unit perhaps similar to page R on the Fairlight CMI. The Movement Drum Systems are known to have been expensive upon release, and it is estimated that approximately thirty were made.

The original designers were John Dickenson (owned the company Movement) and Dave Goodway. Dickenson supplied sounds and the idea (the design, look, how it should work, layout etc.) and Dave Goodway did the electronic side of the drum machine. The Nascom 2 computer was used as the controller.

Its most famous user was David A. Stewart of the Eurythmics, who excelled in the use of this drum computer on their 1983 worldwide hit "Sweet Dreams (Are Made of This)". The machine (MKI) makes an appearance in the video, in a scene in which singer Annie Lennox is seated on top of a table in a meadow, as Dave Stewart types on the Drum Computer's keyboard. In this video the version used is the prototype model with a two-piece base unit and separate monitor. This is the model that also appears briefly near the beginning of the video for "Love On Your Side" by Thompson Twins. Phil Collins used an orange smaller 'one piece' MKII. David Stewart also used this machine on the album Touch and soundtrack album 1984 (For the Love of Big Brother). The last commercial track release on which the Eurythmics used this machine was on Sexcrime (Nineteen Eighty-Four). At this time the Eurythmics chose to use a lot of heavy ambient audio outboard processing to "beef-up" the rather mild and dated sound of this classic machine.

In 1984, Dave Goodway and Jonathan (JJ) Jowitt added MIDI to create an additional 8 track sequencer. Other hardware modifications, like battery-backed memory and disk drives, were added, but the operation was small (only a two-man team). Eventually, the big companies reigned supreme.

Vince Clarke purchased a black version of the MK2 originally owned by Stewart for only £500.

== Usage ==
In addition to the above, the drum machine was also used on the tracks and albums:

- Kim Wilde (Cambodia) and most of her 1982 album Select
- Hot Chocolate (Girl Crazy) and most of their 1982 studio album Mystery
- Thompson Twins on their Quick Step and Side Kick and Into The Gap albums
- John Foxx on his 1981 album The Garden
- Mick Karn on his 1982 album Titles
- Phil Collins on his 1982 album Hello, I Must Be Going! and with Genesis on the 1983 album Genesis

and has been used/owned by:

- Kissing the Pink
- Eurythmics
- Kajagoogoo
