= Roland U-20 =

Synthesizer

U-20
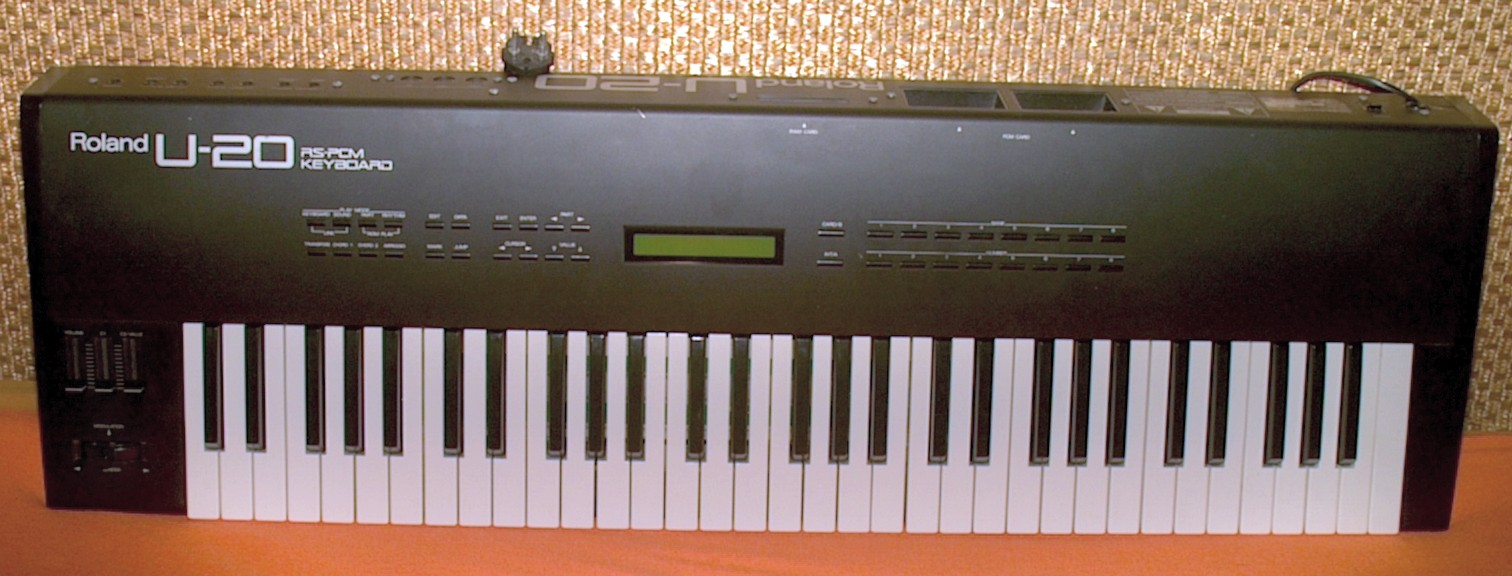
- The U-20 synthesizer
- Manufacturer: Roland Corporation
- Dates: 1989 ~ 1991
- Price: £1050 GBP

Technical specifications
- Polyphony: 30 voices
- Timbrality: 6 parts + 1 drumpart
- Oscillator: 3MB ROM samples
- LFO: 1
- Synthesis type: PCM sample based
- Filter: None
- Attenuator: ADSR envelope
- Aftertouch expression: Yes
- Velocity expression: Yes
- Storage memory: 128 tones, 64 patches
- Effects: Reverb, chorus and delay

Input/output
- Keyboard: 61 keys
- Left-hand control: MIDI + 2 data-sliders
- External control: Arpeggiator, Chord Play

The Roland U-20 is a PCM-sample synthesizer, released by Roland in 1989. It was the keyboard version of the U-220 rack module, which was in turn a similar follow-up product to Roland's U-110 rack module of 1988.

The U-20 is described by Roland as a 'RS-PCM keyboard', where RS stands for ReSynthesized because the sound-engine can play back a modified version of stored PCM samples.

== Overview ==
The synthesizer engine itself merely plays back stored PCM samples. Although the U-20 did contain synthesizer parameters like envelopes to control amplitude and pitch, it is not a subtractive synthesizer because it did not include any filter capability. Nevertheless, sample playback can be slightly customized via editing its ADSR envelope and applying DSP effects, like reverb or chorus. A drawback is the absence of filters.

The U-20 has standard 64 patches, and can be doubled with an optional RAM-card (the M-256E). There are also two extra slots for ROM PCM-cards to expand the number of available sounds.

There's a built-in arpeggiator, a Chord Play feature which plays back a full chord with only one finger, 2 assignable sliders, and the U-20 is compatible with the SN-U110 and SN-MV30-S1 series of soundcards.

With one U-20 it's possible to produce a reasonably complete orchestration. The maximum number of voices is then limited by the device itself.

The U-20 has given certain Roland-sounds more publicity, like the shakuhachi, the bell, guitar-samples with distortion, and the typical Roland piano-sound, which can be found in later Roland models like the JV and XV series.

Editing sounds is limited and relatively complicated due to the small screen and menu layout. Thanks to its popularity, later on there was software made available to edit sounds on a computer via MIDI, or by adding new sounds to the device. There are also hardware presets in programs like Cubase allowing easier communication.

== U-220 ==
The U-220 is a 1U (19-inch rackmount) module of the U-20. It was the successor of the U-110 that was released in 1988. The U-220 has the same LCD screen and expansion possibilities, but fewer knobs on the front panel than the U-20.

== Features ==
Zipboingwow Christmas Show
A collection of traditional Christmas music performed by James D. Blodget on a Roland U-20 synthesizer, demonstrating many of its sounds. (8 MB)

- 128 different voices (additional may be supplied with ROM/RAM cards)
- Programmable DSP unit offers reverb, delay, chorus
- 3 demo songs
- 61 keys with note velocity and aftertouch abilities
- MIDI in/out/thru DIN connectors
- Phones output, mix output (L/R) and direct output (L/R) jacks
- Pedal switch and expression pedal inputs
- Powered by external 110-230 V AC source

== Issues ==
The amount of force needed to trigger aftertouch is very impractical and thus unusable on this instrument. Another point of criticism was the poor readable manual.

Along with the JV series, this was also another Roland model that was plagued by the "red epoxy of death". This red epoxy was used to glue the key weights into the bottom of keys, and over time has a tendency to become viscous and leak out into the unit, harming electronics and overall playability. Roland Japan offered a recall repair on the keybed for a number of years, but has since ceased.
