= Nataraj XT =

- Origin: France
- Genres: Electronic
- Years active: 1998-present
- Labels: Nutone, EMI
- Members: Philippe Capitani; Richard Bernet; Laurent Pernice
- Website: Natarajxt.com

Nataraj XT is a French music band specialized in electronic music with a twist of traditional live Indian music. It was created in Marseille, France, in 1998.

The band is famous for having developed from the start their own version of North Indian electronic music incorporating traditional instruments such as the sarod, the esraj and the sitar. The band Nataraj XT has since then broadened its tones with rock and jazz.

== History ==
Nataraj XT started in a music festival in Marseille, France, and was signed soon after by a French record label after being discovered in French press like Libération. They won the "Electronic Talent" prize in 2000 at the Midem with Elegia Laurent Garnier. Their first album Tandava was recorded in a short time and with a low budget. Following an extensive tour across India and Europe, the band recorded their second album (Ocean Bird) with a higher budget, a Canadian label Nutone/Nettwerk, and a contract signed with EMI.

In 2007, the Sitar player Pierre Grimoud died. The band released what should have been their last album Opposition.

In 2008, Philippe Capitani and Richard Bernet decided to produce a new album with no sitar playing, Without Sitar, in order to keep the band alive. Despite the fact that the band is not well known among the French public, they do have a significant number of fans abroad. They were played in a large number of U.S.A Campuses and on the web.

In 2012, the band was contacted by Artonik Dance Company from Marseille and was asked to compose the music of a show The Colour of Time based on a traditional Indian festival, Holi. A documentary about the show was filmed by France 3 French TV. In order to complete their reconstruction, the band added an electric bass player, Laurent Pernice, and some guitar sounds played by Philippe Capitani. Several shows have been performed in France since 2013. A lot of TV Shows, documentaries and youtubers use their music.

== Discography ==
- Tandava (1999)
- Ocean Birds (2002)
- Space in Asian Lounge compilation from Putumayo World Music (2005)
- Without Sitar (2008)
- Opposition (2009)
- Color of time (2013)
- Lo-Fi Relax (2023)
- Zen Eastern Serenity (2024)

== Personnel ==
=== Current band members ===
- Kapi (Philippe Capitani) : Drum, Bass, Guitar, Computers
- Rishi (Richard Bernet son of Ralph Bernet) French author of L'Idole des jeunes (album) : Esraj, Sarod, Flûte, Dotara
- Laurent Pernice : Basse, gopichandi

=== Past band members ===
- Pierre Moïtram (Pierre Grimoud) : Sitar (died in 2007)
- Nathalie Arini : Sitar
