= Singapore Real Estate Exchange =

Singapore Real Estate Exchange (SRX) is a consortium of leading real estate agencies administered by StreetSine Technology Group in Singapore. The Exchange provides the prices of recently sold properties to participating real estate agents more rapidly than conventional, official channels run by the Urban Redevelopment Authority and Housing Development Board.

StreetSine Technology Group, a subsidiary of Singapore Press Holdings (SPH), is the leader in digital property in Singapore, offering one-stop real estate services including residential and commercial Quality Listings on SRX Property, full valuations from srx.com.sg/valuations, and mortgage financing in collaboration with Maybank on srx.com.sg/mortgage.

StreetSine Technology Group integrates big data sets with mobile workflow applications to help real estate-related organizations and professionals employ real-time, relevant, proprietary information in the marketing of their products and services.

== History ==
- StreetSine and market leaders PropNex, HSR, DWG, and OrangeTee soft-launched the Exchange on 15 July 2011 as part of a coordinated industry effort to share proprietary pricing information and increase efficiency, productivity, and transparency in the market.
- By 8 December 2011, SRX expanded its Member Companies to most of the market, including ERA Real Estate, C&H, ECG Real Estate, DTZ, Huttons, Savills, and Re/Max.
- SRX was officially launched on 8 December 2011 with a ceremony attended by industry leaders, government officials, regulators, professors from Singapore's leading universities and members of the media.

== Validated listings ==
The estate agencies created the exchange to provide validated listings. Listings are validated through the internal systems of the estate agencies following the Estate Agent Agreement for exclusive listings as prescribed by Council of Estate Agencies (CEA). Unlike other property portals in Singapore, the validation listing process through the SRX network of the eleven leading estate agencies ensures that no listing is a dummy or duplicate.

== Technology enabler ==
SRX is an electronic information network administered by StreetSine. It is responsible for collecting, cleaning, filtering, processing, and disseminating information via the internet, smart phones, and tablets.

== Government collaboration ==
Effective 15 November 2011, the InfoComm Development Authority (IDA) of Singapore awarded StreetSine a government grant to further develop SRX as a platform to improve the transparency and liquidity of real estate transactions in Singapore.

== Members ==
As of April 2017, the 15 members of the Singapore Real Estate Exchange are:

ERA	Huttons	Edmund Tie & Company	SLP	Savills
C&H	CBRE	Century 21	PropNex	OrangeTee
DWG	HSR	KFPN	Global Alliance	Scotia
