= Roland MC-09 =

Synthesizer

MC-09 PhraseLab
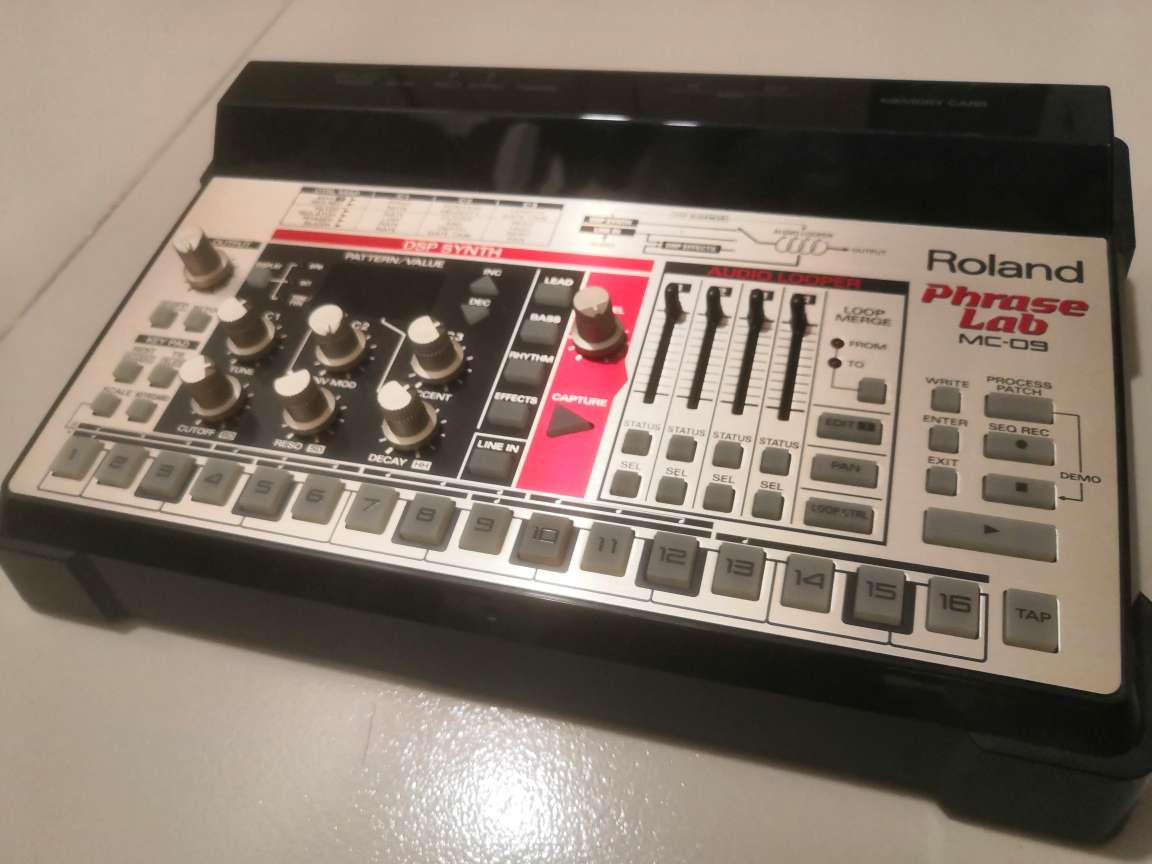
- Manufacturer: Roland Corporation
- Dates: 2002

Technical specifications
- Polyphony: monophonic, rhythm: 3 tones
- Timbrality: 16-part
- Synthesis type: digital modelling synthesizer
- Storage memory: Lead preset patterns: 40, Bass preset: 60, Rhythm preset: 100, Effect preset: 30, User: 20, Optional SmartMedia Card: 50
- Effects: Filter, Isolator, Phaser, Slicer, Overdrive, Distortion, Ring Modulator

Input/output
- Keyboard: No
- External control: MIDI in/out

The Roland MC-09 "PhraseLab" is a Roland synthesizer, described as a Roland TB-303 emulator featuring an effects processor and a 4-part phrase sampler.
