= Rompler =

Electronic musical instrument

A rompler is an electronic musical instrument that plays pre-fabricated sounds based on audio samples. The term rompler is a blend of the terms ROM and sampler. In contrast to samplers, romplers do not record audio. Both may have additional sound editing features, such as layering several waveforms and modulation with attack, decay, sustain and release envelopes (ADSR), filters and low-frequency oscillators (LFO).

The waveforms are commonly stored in form of PCM-encoded waveforms which were similar to those stored in WAV or AIFF file formats, although in some hardware design other encodings and forms of (usually lossless) compression could be used.

The core characteristic of a rompler, compared to a sampler, is that they do not have the ability to record new samples, or in case of software instruments, the ability to add user samples from disk.

Note that earlier digital synthesizers, which used short-cycle sampled waveforms, are usually not considered romplers but are either called "PCM synthesizers" or "wavetable synthesizers" because the sampled waveform in this case is usually only made of a single full cycle (or a handful of full cycles) of the wave and would therefore be a fraction of a second in length, whereas in case of a sampler or a rompler, the recording would usually contain the sample's decay and sometimes even release sections, such as with a recorded drum hit or piano note. Also, in their usage of sampled waves, filters (usually digital) were employed to gradually alter the timbre of cycling wave which makes them somewhat similar to analog subtractive synthesizers. However, in many such designs, the attack section of a sound was often sampled as a full, longer sample, and then crossfaded or mixed with the looping PCM waveform, such as with Roland's linear arithmetic synthesis and its competitors from other manufacturers, further blurring the difference.

Hardware romplers emerged in the late 1980s, as price drops of memory chips allowed for longer recording storage to be used without making the instruments prohibitively expensive. They were meant to displace previous FM and PCM-based digital synthesizers in the market, by offering more realistic sound of real, acoustic and electronic instruments, and by the early 1990s they became the dominant technology for mainstream keyboards. The most successful early romplers are considered to be Korg M1 workstation, and E-mu Proteus module.

Before the emergence of software virtual instruments, computer sound hardware gradually shifted from synthesizer based sound and music reproduction (such as with Commodore SID or Yamaha OPN chips) to PCM-based chips, such as Commodore Amiga's Paula. Combined with computer's RAM and disk storage, these chips allowed for longer PCM recordings to be reproduced, and games and other software often used rompler-like software technology to reproduce music, most notable example being music trackers on Amiga. Later computer sound hardware employed hardware rompler and sample-based synthesizers (such as Gravis Ultrasound and E-mu/Creative SoundBlaster) to increase number of voices and reduce CPU usage for sound processing.

As the processing power of personal computers grew, these hardware synthesizers were gradually abandoned and sound hardware of contemporary computers now usually has only PCM reproduction converters with all synthesis and reproduction logic implemented in software. Modern computers are capable of real-time reproduction of large number of voices, as well as real-time emulation of analogue sound circuits. With the introduction of digital audio workstations, musicians started to employ more and more virtual instruments, so a market for software romplers, as a source of instantly available sampled instruments, also emerged. Some popular examples of software romplers are reFX Nexus, Native Instruments Kontakt, Spectrasonics Omnisphere, Steinberg HALion, Roland Zenology, UVI Falcon and IK Multimedia Sampletank.

== Notable romplers ==
- Kurzweil K250 (1984) is arguably the first true ROMpler. It made headlines with its realistic instruments stored on ROM chips. However, it could be extended with sampler capabilities with optional additional hardware.
- Korg M1 (1988), the Korg M1 was one of the first commercially successful ROMplers. It features a range of iconic sound presets, including the famous "M1 Piano" used in 1990s house music.
- E-mu Proteus (1989) was popular among producers for its high-quality samples and ease of use.
- Kurzweil K2000 (1990) was one of the first ROMplers to incorporate a powerful synthesis engine V.A.S.T, making it a favorite of musicians and sound designers alike.
- Roland Sound Canvas (1991), the first successful budget-oriented ROMpler, giving rise to the "MIDI module" market for PC enthusiasts and video game composers alike.
- Roland JV-1080 (1994) was used extensively in electronic, film score and pop music in the 1990s.
- Yamaha Motif series (2001) is known for its realistic sounds and extensive synthesis capabilities.
- Native Instruments Kontakt (2002) is a virtual instrument that offers a vast library of samples and an intuitive interface for creating custom instruments.
- Steinberg's HALion is one of the most popular and one of the most versatile software rompler
