= 5 Years in a Livetime =

5 Years in a LIVEtime

Video by Dream Theater
- Released: October 27, 1998
- Recorded: Various
- Genre: Progressive metal, progressive rock
- Label: EastWest Records

Dream Theater chronology
Images and Words: Live in Tokyo (1993)	5 Years in a LIVEtime (1998)	Metropolis 2000: Scenes from New York (2001)

Professional ratings
Review scores
Source	Rating
AllMusic	3/5 stars

5 Years in a LIVEtime is the second video album by American progressive metal band Dream Theater. The video contains a mix of concert footage, promotional video clips, and behind-the-scenes and interview footage from the five years in between the release of their previous home video, Images and Words: Live in Tokyo, and this video. Included in the video are the following:

- The making of their 1994 album, Awake.
- Footage from the "Waking Up the World" tour.
- Footage from the 1995 "Uncovered" show at Ronnie Scott's Jazz Club.
- The making of their 1997 album, Falling into Infinity.
- Footage from the "Touring into Infinity" tour, including the Paris concert featured on the accompanying Once in a LIVEtime CD and the "unplugged" fan club show in Rotterdam.
- Video clips for the songs "Lie", "The Silent Man", and "Hollow Years".

== Track listing ==
1. "Burning My Soul"
2. "Cover My Eyes"
3. "Lie" (video clip)
4. "6:00"
5. "Voices"
6. "The Silent Man" (video clip)
7. "Damage, Inc." (With Barney Greenway of Napalm Death)
8. "Easter" (With Steve Hogarth and Steve Rothery of Marillion)
9. "Starship Trooper" (With Steve Howe)
10. "Hollow Years" (video clip)
11. "Puppies on Acid"
12. "Just Let Me Breathe"
13. "Perfect Strangers"
14. "Speak To Me"
15. "Lifting Shadows Off A Dream"
16. "Anna Lee"
17. "To Live Forever"
18. "Metropolis Pt. 1: The Miracle and the Sleeper"
19. "Peruvian Skies"
20. "Learning to Live"
21. "A Change of Seasons"

The album cover is created by Storm Thorgerson (Pink Floyd).

== Re-releases ==
In 2004, 5 Years in a LIVEtime was released on DVD as disc 2 of the Images and Words: Live in Tokyo / 5 Years in a LIVEtime set. A commentary track by the band members was included on the DVD.

== Connections ==
As with many of their live shows, Dream Theater included many references and connections to other artist's songs, including the following examples:

- During the performance of 'Peruvian Skies', riffs from Metallica's "Enter Sandman" and Pink Floyd's "Have a Cigar" are incorporated into the song. This song is one of the songs filmed in Paris that is featured on the Once in a LIVEtime CD.
