= Live Scenes from New York =

2000 live album by Dream Theater

- Revised album artwork

Live album by Dream Theater
- Released: September 11, 2001 (recalled); October 16, 2001 (re-issue)
- Recorded: August 30, 2000
- Venues: Roseland Ballroom, New York
- Genres: Progressive metal; progressive rock
- Length: 187:31
- Label: Elektra
- Producer: Kevin Shirley

Dream Theater chronology
Metropolis Pt. 2: Scenes from a Memory (1999)	Live Scenes from New York (2001)	Six Degrees of Inner Turbulence (2002)

Alternative cover
- Original album artwork

Professional ratings
Review scores
Source	Rating
Allmusic	4/5 stars

Live Scenes from New York is the third live album by American progressive metal band Dream Theater, recorded on August 30, 2000, at the Roseland Ballroom in New York City. Live Scenes from New York is the audio counterpart to the Metropolis 2000: Scenes from New York DVD, released in 2001, except only the CD has the full concert. The third disc contains two videos of the concert that are not on the DVD, the music video for "Another Day", and Jordan Rudess's keyboard solo. This is Dream Theater's first live release with Rudess and first full-length live release.

Drummer Mike Portnoy collapsed after the concert. He said, "I collapsed due to over-exhaustion, dehydration, stress, too little food and nutrition, too many Red Bulls, etc. It took me several hours of throwing up, being wrapped in blankets and laying down before I was carried out of the venue hours after the show."

== Cover artwork ==
Coincidentally, the album was originally released on September 11, 2001. Because the cover artwork depicts the New York skyline, including the twin towers of the World Trade Center, in flames, it was recalled and re-released shortly with the band's Majesty symbol in gold instead. The original artwork was based on the cover for Dream Theater's 1992 album Images and Words, which includes a heart in flames and wrapped in barbed wire. In the heart’s place for this release was an apple instead, for New York City’s nickname "The Big Apple".

== Track listing ==
All music was composed by Dream Theater except where noted.

Disc 1
No.	Title	Lyrics	Length
1.	"Regression" (music: Petrucci)	John Petrucci	2:46
2.	"Overture 1928"	(instrumental)	3:32
3.	"Strange Déjà Vu"	Mike Portnoy	5:02
4.	"Through My Words" (music: Petrucci)	Petrucci	1:42
5.	"Fatal Tragedy"	John Myung	6:21
6.	"Beyond This Life"	Petrucci	11:16
7.	"John & Theresa Solo Spot"	(instrumental)	3:17
8.	"Through Her Eyes"	Petrucci	6:17
9.	"Home"	Portnoy	13:21
10.	"The Dance of Eternity"	(instrumental)	6:24
Total length:			59:58

Disc 2
No.	Title	Lyrics	Length
1.	"One Last Time"	James LaBrie	4:11
2.	"The Spirit Carries On" (music: Petrucci)	Petrucci	7:40
3.	"Finally Free"	Portnoy	10:59
4.	"Metropolis—Part I: "The Miracle and the Sleeper""	Petrucci	10:36
5.	"The Mirror" (contains an excerpt from "Lie")	Portnoy	8:15
6.	"Just Let Me Breathe"	Portnoy	4:02
7.	"Acid Rain" (music: Liquid Tension Experiment)	(instrumental)	2:34
8.	"Caught in a New Millennium" (mashup of "Caught in a Web" and "New Millennium", contains elements of "Paradigm Shift" by Liquid Tension Experiment)	LaBrie, Petrucci, Portnoy	6:21
9.	"Another Day"	Petrucci	5:13
10.	"Jordan Rudess Keyboard Solo (contains elements of "Universal Mind" by Liquid Tension Experiment)" (music: Jordan Rudess)	(instrumental)	6:40
Total length:			66:31

Disc 3
No.	Title	Lyrics	Length
1.	"Erotomania"	(instrumental)	7:22
2.	"Voices"	Petrucci	9:45
3.	"The Silent Man" (music: Petrucci)	Petrucci	5:09
4.	"Learning to Live"	Myung	14:02
5.	"A Change of Seasons"	Portnoy	24:35
Total length:			60:53

Disc three also contains the video for "Another Day" and the keyboard solo.

== Personnel ==
Dream Theater

- James LaBrie – lead vocals, percussion
- John Myung – bass
- John Petrucci – guitars, backing vocals
- Mike Portnoy – drums, backing vocals
- Jordan Rudess – keyboards

Additional personnel

- Theresa Thomason – guest vocals on "Through Her Eyes" and "The Spirit Carries On"
- Gospel Choir – on "The Spirit Carries On"
- Jo Marno – Choir Coordinator
- Jay Beckenstein – soprano sax on "Another Day"
- Kent Broadhurst – The Hypnotherapist

== Chart performance ==
Chart (2001)	Peak position
French Albums (SNEP)	117
German Albums (Offizielle Top 100)	71
Hungarian Albums (MAHASZ)	35
Italian Albums (FIMI)	23
US Billboard 200	120
US Top Internet Albums (Billboard)	7
