= Metropolis 2000: Scenes from New York =

Video by Dream Theater
- Released: April 21, 2001
- Recorded: August 30, 2000
- Venue: Roseland Ballroom, New York
- Genre: Progressive rock; progressive metal
- Length: 143:00 (DVD, with bonus material); 82:00 (VHS tape)
- Label: Elektra
- Producer: Ron Bennington

Dream Theater chronology
5 Years in a Livetime (1998)	Metropolis 2000: Scenes from New York (2001)	Live at Budokan (2004)

Professional ratings
Review scores
Source	Rating
Metal Review	10/10 stars

Metropolis 2000: Scenes from New York is the third video album by American progressive metal band Dream Theater, released on April 21, 2001 by Elektra Records. The live performance was recorded during the final concert of the U.S. leg of the Metropolis 2000 tour at the Roseland Ballroom in New York City on August 30, 2000.

Broadway and film actor Kent Broadhurst assisted the band with live narration in the role of the hypnotherapist, replacing Terry Brown, who had threatened to sue the band for using his recorded spoken parts from the album in a live setting.

The VHS release of Metropolis 2000: Scenes from New York was heavily shortened and only contains the performance of Metropolis Pt. 2: Scenes from a Memory. The entire concert is on CD on Live Scenes From New York.

== Track listing ==
Act I
No.	Title	Length
1.	"Scene 1: Regression"	2:46
2.	"Scene 2: Part I. Overture 1928"	3:32
3.	"Scene 2: Part II. Strange Deja-Vu"	5:02
4.	"Scene 3: Part I. Through My Words"	1:42
5.	"Scene 3: Part II. Fatal Tragedy"	6:21
6.	"Scene 4: Beyond This Life"	11:26
7.	"John & Theresa Solo Spot"	3:17
8.	"Scene 5: Through Her Eyes"	6:17

Act II
No.	Title	Length
9.	"Scene 6: Home"	13:21
10.	"Scene 7: Part I. The Dance of Eternity"	6:24
11.	"Scene 7: Part II: One Last Time"	4:11
12.	"Scene 8: The Spirit Carries On"	7:40
13.	"Scene 9: Finally Free"	10:59

=== DVD Bonus Tracks ===
No.	Title	Length
1.	"A Mind Beside Itself I: Erotomania"	7:22
2.	"A Mind Beside Itself II: Voices"	9:45
3.	"A Mind Beside Itself III: The Silent Man"	5:09
4.	"Learning to Live"	14:02
5.	"A Change of Seasons"	24:35

== Reception ==
The album received a gold RIAA certification on November 8, 2002.
