= The Studio Albums 1992–2011 =

Box set by Dream Theater
- Released: 8 July 2014
- Recorded: 1991–2011 at various studios
- Genre: Progressive metal, progressive rock
- Label: Roadrunner

The Studio Albums 1992–2011 is an eleven compact disc box set by American progressive metal band Dream Theater, released by Roadrunner on July 8, 2014. It contains ten of the twelve WMG-era Dream Theater studio albums; as the title indicates, the box set spans the years from 1992 to 2011, and does not include the band's 1989 debut album When Dream and Day Unite or their self-titled twelfth studio album, which was released ten months before the box set. The albums are placed in chronological order.

== Disc list ==
- Disc 1: Images and Words
- Disc 2: Awake
- Disc 3: Falling into Infinity
- Disc 4: Metropolis Pt. 2: Scenes from a Memory
- Disc 5: Six Degrees of Inner Turbulence (disc 1)
- Disc 6: Six Degrees of Inner Turbulence (disc 2)
- Disc 7: Train of Thought
- Disc 8: Octavarium
- Disc 9: Systematic Chaos
- Disc 10: Black Clouds & Silver Linings
- Disc 11: A Dramatic Turn of Events
