= A Mind Beside Itself =

1994 song cycle by Dream Theater

"A Mind Beside Itself" is a three-part song cycle by American progressive metal band Dream Theater, comprising the songs "Erotomania", "Voices" and "The Silent Man". It was first released on Dream Theater's 1994 album Awake.

Drummer Mike Portnoy stated that the instrumental "Erotomania" was written "off the cuff" as "a bit of a joke and parody". Guitarist John Petrucci penned the lyrics to "Voices", dealing with the subject of mental illness. He researched schizophrenia and similar disorders and used religious terms "to make things more vivid". "When I was writing it, I saw these terms and medical things that were just brilliant," he said. "Like there was a guy who felt that his skin was inside out. I read that and was like 'Oh my God! That's unbelievable; I've got to write about that.'" Petrucci wrote the music and lyrics to the acoustic "The Silent Man". LaBrie described the lyrics as dealing with "communication breakdown, for instance between a father and a son. We feel that we have to play certain roles when around one of our parents, and we never really get to know the real person. I'm lucky that I behave with my own father like I would a friend. We can joke around and go for a beer." A full live performance of the suite can be found on the 2000 Live Scenes from New York album.

== Parts ==
=== "I. Erotomania" ===
"Erotomania" is a fairly progressive piece, with a lot of switching and changes of tone, tempo and style, though this may have to do with the patchwork style writing more than a specific urge to write a varied song. "Erotomania" is made up of several different parts, many taken from other songs or sources. For instance, the chorus of "The Silent Man" features in a guitar solo. A section that was originally cut from "Pull Me Under" was also used in shaping the song. As it is part of a suite, the song flows directly into "Voices" without any sort of pause.

"Erotomania" is played commonly and almost always segues right into "Voices" even when the entire suite is not being played. The main riff is also played as part of the "Instrumedley".

=== "II. Voices" ===
"Voices" is the second part of the cycle, and the longest of the three. Petrucci wrote "Voices" about mental illness, particularly schizophrenia, while using religious themes to make the song more metaphorical and vivid. "...There was a guy who felt that his skin was inside out." Petrucci said. "I read that and was like 'Oh my God! That's unbelievable; I've got to write about that." "Voices" can be said to follow the theme of "Erotomania". The song follows this concept as it explores the relationship between sex, religion and insanity. However, this is a smaller part of the song's meaning. "Voices" is a progressive crescendo, which starts off quiet and low-key, but gets increasingly more complex and intense as it goes on, finally building to a climax, where the song then flows into "The Silent Man".

"Voices" is performed live somewhat often, usually preceded by "Erotomania", though not exclusively so. It is uncommon for the band to play "Voices" in its entirety, usually opting for an edited version. Fans have speculated that this may be done to spare James LaBrie's voice due to his vocal injury though even after his recovery the band continues to play the edited version. Although playing the entire suite is common, it is not uncommon for the band to sub out the third part with another song, such as "The Spirit Carries On" or "Solitary Shell".

=== "III. The Silent Man" ===
"The Silent Man"

Single by Dream Theater

from the album Awake
- Released: January 20, 1995 (EU)
- Recorded: May–July 1994
- Studio: One on One Studios and Devonshire Studios in North Hollywood, Los Angeles
- Genre: Progressive rock; acoustic rock
- Length: 3:47
- Label: East West
- Producers: John Purdell, Duane Baron

"The Silent Man" is the third part of the cycle, and the second single, EP and video release from the album. LaBrie described the lyrics as dealing with "communication breakdown, for instance between a father and a son. We feel that we have to play certain roles when around one of our parents, and we never really get to know the real person. I'm lucky that I behave with my own father like I would a friend. We can joke around and go for a beer." The song follows the same religious tones as its predecessor, "Voices".

"The Silent Man" is an acoustic ballad, with very little in the way of percussion. The song is a somber epilogue after the climax at the end of "Voices". The music video, co-directed by Portnoy, was filmed on February 5, 1995 in Germany and includes much of the imagery from the Awake album's artwork.

The band would often play a full-band arrangement with electric guitar, drums, bass and piano. Those performances would also include some extended piano/guitar trade-off solos towards the end of the song.

== "The Silent Man" single track listing ==
1. "The Silent Man" (LP version)
2. "Take the Time" (Demo version)
3. "Eve"

== Personnel ==
=== Dream Theater ===
- James LaBrie – background vocals, lead vocals
- Kevin Moore – keyboards
- John Myung – bass
- John Petrucci – guitars
- Mike Portnoy – drums, percussion
