= Dream Theater =

American progressive metal band

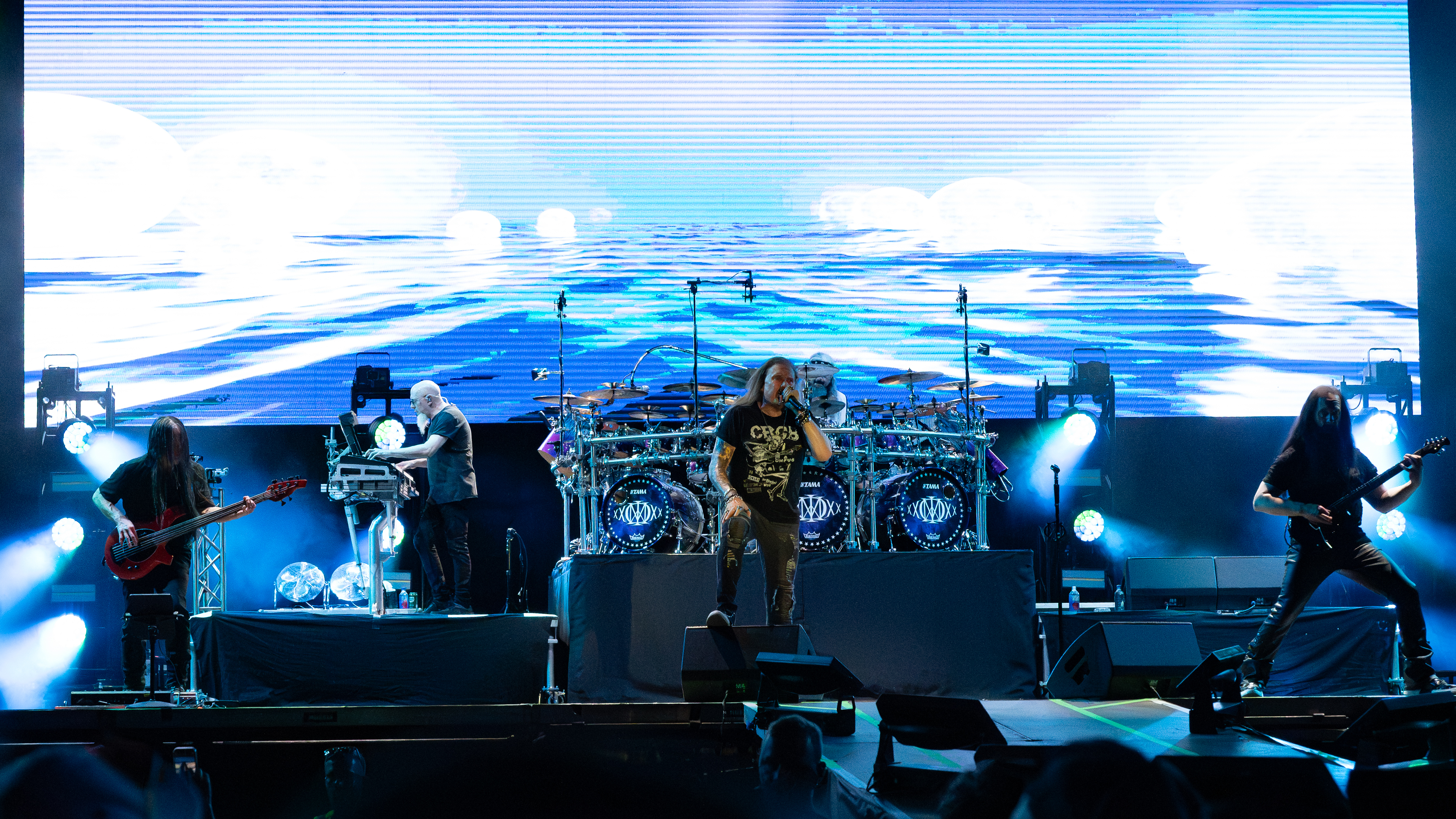
- Dream Theater performing in 2025. (L–R): John Myung, Jordan Rudess, James LaBrie, Mike Portnoy and John Petrucci.

Background information
- Also known as: Majesty (1985–1988)
- Origin: Boston, Massachusetts, U.S.
- Genre: Progressive metal
- Works: Discography
- Years active: 1985–present
- Labels: Inside Out; Roadrunner; Warner Bros.; Atlantic; Elektra; East West; Atco; Mechanic; YtseJam
- Spinoffs: Liquid Tension Experiment; Explorers Club; OSI; Platypus; Sons of Apollo; Metal Allegiance
- Members: John Myung; John Petrucci; Mike Portnoy; James LaBrie; Jordan Rudess
- Past members: Chris Collins; Charlie Dominici; Kevin Moore; Derek Sherinian; Mike Mangini
- Website: dreamtheater.net
- Logo
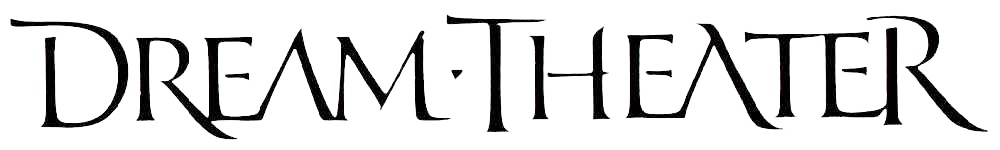

Dream Theater is an American progressive metal band formed in 1985 in Boston, Massachusetts. The band comprises John Petrucci (guitar), John Myung (bass), Mike Portnoy (drums), James LaBrie (vocals), and Jordan Rudess (keyboards).

Dream Theater was formed under the name Majesty by Petrucci, Myung and Portnoy—all from Long Island, New York—while they attended Berklee College of Music. They dropped out to concentrate on the band. Dream Theater has undergone various lineup changes, though Petrucci and Myung have remained constant and Portnoy continues to play with the band as of 2026. After a brief stint with Chris Collins, followed by Charlie Dominici (who was dismissed from Dream Theater shortly after the release of their 1989 debut album When Dream and Day Unite), LaBrie was hired as the band's singer in 1991. Dream Theater's original keyboardist, Kevin Moore, left the band after three albums and was replaced by Derek Sherinian in 1995 after a period of touring. They recorded one album (and an EP) with Sherinian, who was replaced by current keyboardist Jordan Rudess in 1999. Portnoy left the band in 2010 to pursue other musical interests, and was replaced by Mike Mangini; he rejoined the band in October 2023.

Dream Theater has released 16 studio albums. The band's highest-selling release is their second album Images and Words (1992), which reached No. 61 on the Billboard 200 chart. Other albums such as Awake (1994) and Six Degrees of Inner Turbulence (2002) also entered the charts at No. 32 and No. 46 respectively, and each received critical acclaim. Their fifth album, Metropolis Pt. 2: Scenes from a Memory (1999), was ranked number 95 on the October 2006 issue of Guitar World magazine's list of the greatest 100 guitar albums of all time. It was also ranked as the 15th Greatest Concept Album in March 2003 by Classic Rock magazine.

By 2018, Dream Theater had sold over 12 million records worldwide; they have received four Grammy Award nominations, including one win in 2022. Along with Queensrÿche and Fates Warning, the band has been referred to as one of the "Big Three" of the progressive metal genre, responsible for its development and popularization. Additionally, the staff of Loudwire named them the 38th best metal band of all time.

== History ==
=== Formation (1985–1987) ===
In 1985, guitarist John Petrucci, bassist John Myung, and drummer Mike Portnoy decided to form a band while attending Berklee College of Music in Boston. Petrucci and Myung were childhood friends from Kings Park, New York, and met Portnoy of Long Beach, New York while at Berklee. The trio started by covering Rush and Iron Maiden songs in the rehearsal rooms at Berklee.

Myung, Petrucci, and Portnoy agreed on the name Majesty for their newly formed group. According to The Score So Far... documentary, they were waiting in line for tickets to a Rush concert at the Berklee Performance Center while listening to the band on a boom box. Portnoy commented that the ending of the song "Bastille Day" sounded "majestic".

Petrucci asked his high school bandmate Kevin Moore to play the keyboard, and another friend from home, Chris Collins, was recruited as lead vocalist after band members heard him sing a cover of "Queen of the Reich" by Queensrÿche. During this time, Portnoy, Petrucci, and Myung's hectic schedules forced them to abandon their studies to concentrate on their music, as they did not feel they could learn more in college. Moore also left his college, SUNY Fredonia, to concentrate on the band.

"Another Won"
"Another Won" from The Majesty Demos

The beginning months of 1986 were filled with various concert dates in and around the New York City area. During this time, the band recorded a collection of demos, titled The Majesty Demos. The initial run of 1,000 sold out within six months, and dubbed copies of the cassette became popular within the progressive metal scene. The Majesty Demos were later released officially on CD, through Portnoy's YtseJam Records (and on InsideOut in 2022, after YtseJam Records was shut down).

Chris Collins left the band in November 1986. After a year of trying to find a replacement, Charlie Dominici, who was far older and more experienced than anyone else in the band, successfully auditioned for the group. With the stability that Dominici's appointment brought to Majesty, they began to increase the number of shows played in the New York City area, gaining a considerable amount of exposure.

Shortly after hiring Dominici, a Las Vegas group also named Majesty threatened legal action for intellectual property infringement related to the use of their name. Various alternatives were proposed and tested, among them Glasser, Magus, and M1, which were all rejected, though the band did go as Glasser for about a week, with poor reactions from fans. Eventually, Portnoy's father suggested the name Dream Theater, the name of a small theater in Monterey, California, and the name stuck.

=== When Dream and Day Unite (1988–1990) ===
With their new name and band stability, Dream Theater concentrated on writing more material while playing more concerts in New York and in neighboring states. This eventually attracted the attention of Mechanic Records, a division of MCA. Dream Theater signed their first record contract with Mechanic on June 23, 1988, and recorded their debut album at Kajem Victory Studios in Gladwyne, Pennsylvania. Recording the basic tracks took about ten days, and the entire album was completed in about three weeks.

When Dream and Day Unite was released in March 1989 to far less fanfare than the band had anticipated. Mechanic ended up breaking the majority of the financial promises they had made to Dream Theater before signing their contract, so the band was restricted to playing around New York City. The promotional tour for the album consisted of just five concerts, all of which were relatively local, with the first being at the Sundance in Bay Shore, New York opening for Zebra.

After the fourth show, Charlie Dominici was let go. The band wanted a singer like Bruce Dickinson or Geoff Tate, and they felt that Dominici's singing and stage presence was not what they wanted for a frontman. Shortly after, however, Marillion asked Dream Theater to open for them at a gig at the Ritz in New York, so Dominici was allowed to perform one last time.

=== Addition of James LaBrie and Images and Words (1991–1993) ===
"Pull Me Under"
"Pull Me Under" from Images and Words.

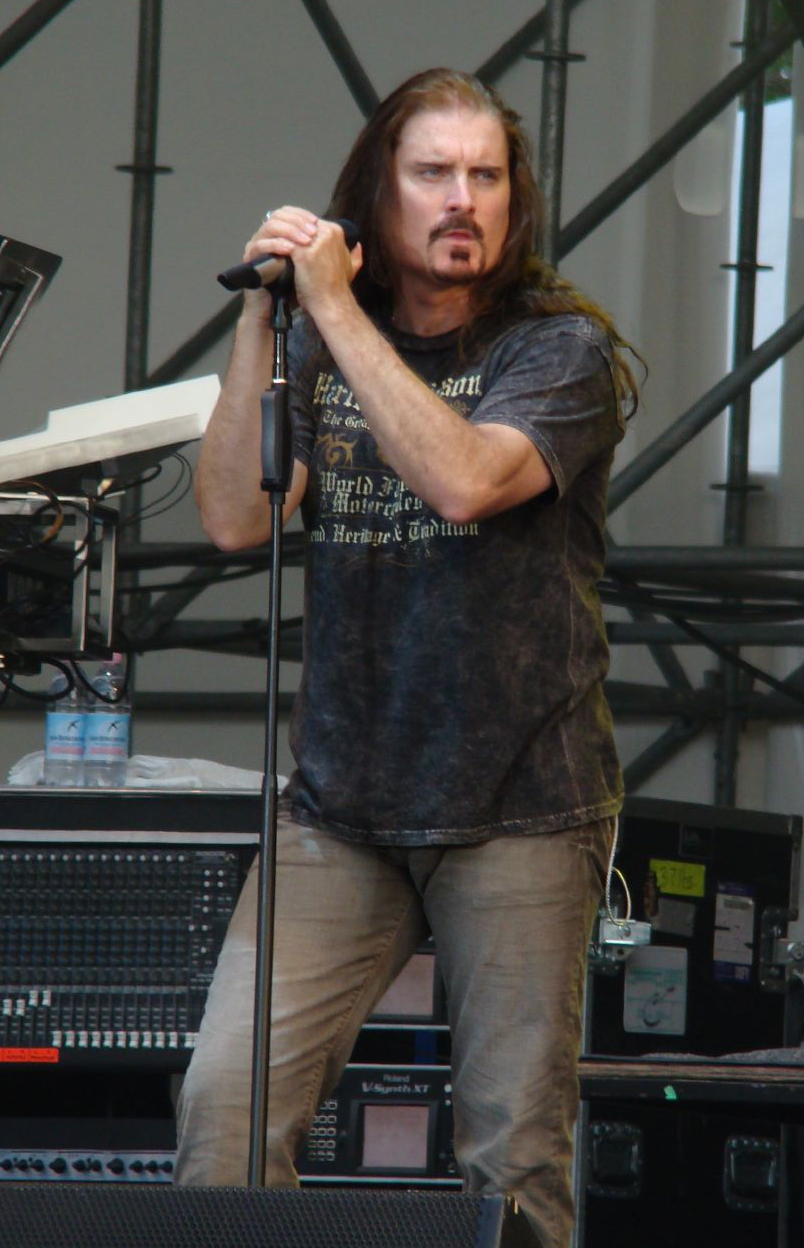
James LaBrie has been the vocalist since January 1991.

Following Dominici's departure, Dream Theater fought successfully to be released from their contract with Mechanic. The band then auditioned over 200 singers, among them former Fates Warning frontman John Arch. Arch ultimately decided that his commitments were more important and he opted not to join the band. On June 9, 1990, at a gig at Sundance in Bay Shore, New York, Dream Theater introduced Steve Stone as their new singer after playing half the set as an instrumental band. Stone had successfully recorded demos with Dream Theater, but he was fired following a single, ill-fated live performance. According to Mike Portnoy, Stone moved around the stage in a rather odd manner, seemingly doing a bad impression of Bruce Dickinson. Additionally, he shouted "Scream for me Long Beach!" several times throughout the show (Dickinson can be heard saying this on Iron Maiden's live album Live After Death), although they were performing in Bay Shore. The audience was immediately turned off by the new singer. It was five months before Dream Theater played another show, this time all-instrumental under the name YtseJam. Until 1991, the band remained focused in an attempt to hire another singer and writing additional music. It was during this period that they wrote the majority of what would become Images and Words (1992).

In January 1991, the band received a demo tape from Kevin James LaBrie, of glam metal band Winter Rose, just before committing to another singer. They were so impressed by his demo that he was flown from Canada to New York for an audition. LaBrie jammed on three songs with the band and was immediately hired to fill the vocalist position. Once recruited, LaBrie decided to drop his first name to avoid confusion with the other Kevin in the band. For the next few months, the band returned to playing live shows (still mostly around New York City), while working on vocal parts for the music written before acquiring LaBrie. Derek Shulman and ATCO Records (now East West), a division of Elektra Records, signed Dream Theater to a seven-album contract based on a three-song demo (later made available as "The Atco Demos" through the Dream Theater fan club).

The first album to be recorded under their new record contract was Images and Words (1992). For promotion, the label released a CD single and video clip for the song "Another Day", but neither made significant commercial impact. The song "Pull Me Under", however, managed to garner a high level of radio airplay without any organized promotion from the band or their label. In response, ATCO produced a video clip for "Pull Me Under", which saw heavy rotation on MTV. A third video clip was produced for "Take the Time", but it was not nearly as successful as "Pull Me Under".

The success of "Pull Me Under", combined with relentless touring throughout the U.S. and Japan, caused Images and Words to achieve gold record certification in the States and platinum status in Japan. A tour of Europe followed in 1993, which included a show at London's famed Marquee Club. This show was recorded and released as Live at the Marquee, Dream Theater's first official live album. Additionally, a video compilation of their Japanese concerts (mixed in with documentary-style footage of the off-stage portion of the tour) was released as Images and Words: Live in Tokyo.

=== Awake and Kevin Moore's departure (1994–1995) ===
"A Mind Beside Itself: II – Voices"
"Voices" from Awake.

Eager to work on fresh material, Dream Theater retreated to the studio in May 1994. Awake, Dream Theater's third studio album, was released on October 4, 1994. Shortly before the album was mixed, Moore had announced to the rest of the band that he would be quitting Dream Theater to concentrate on his musical interests, since he was no longer interested in touring or the style of music which Dream Theater performed. As a result, the band had to scramble to find a replacement keyboardist before a tour could be considered.

Jens Johansson was among the biggest names to audition, but the band members were eager to fill the position with keyboardist Jordan Rudess. Portnoy and Petrucci had come across Rudess in Keyboard Magazine, where he was recognized as "best new talent" in the readers' poll. The two invited him to play a trial gig with the band at the Concrete Foundations Forum in Burbank, California. Although the show was a success, and Rudess was asked to fill the keyboardist position permanently, he opted to tour with The Dixie Dregs instead since it granted him more personal latitude. Dream Theater hired fellow Berklee alumnus Derek Sherinian, who had previously toured and recorded with Alice Cooper and Kiss, to fill in for the Waking Up the World Tour. By the conclusion of the tour, the band decided to take Sherinian on as Moore's full-time replacement.

=== A Change of Seasons, Falling into Infinity (1995–1998) ===
"A Change of Seasons"
"Carpe Diem/The Darkest of Winters" bridge from A Change of Seasons.

Once again finding themselves with a new member, the band did not immediately start working on new material. Fans around the world, united on the YtseJam Mailing List (the most popular form of communication between Dream Theater fans at that point), had begun to put pressure on the band to officially release the song "A Change of Seasons". This had been written in 1989 and was intended to be a part of Images and Words, but at almost 17 minutes, it was deemed too long for studio placement. It had nevertheless been performed live by the band, who continued to revise it in the years leading up to 1995.

The petition was successful, and the group entered BearTracks Studios in New York in May 1995 to rewrite and record the now 23-minute-long song with Sherinian contributing significantly to the final product. The band released A Change of Seasons as an EP along with a collection of cover songs from a live show recorded at Ronnie Scott's Jazz Club in London earlier that year.

After a brief run of small concerts and a short break, the band released a special Christmas CD through their official fan club, consisting of rare live tracks recorded during the band's early years. They continued releasing a new CD each Christmas until 2005.

Meanwhile, there were several changes at East West, and Dream Theater's main contact within the label was fired. As a result, the new team at the company were unaccustomed to the relationship Dream Theater had with former East West personnel, and they pressured them to write an album that was more accessible. In mid-1997, they entered the studio to write their next album. In addition to pressuring the band to adopt a more mainstream sound, East West recruited writer/producer Desmond Child to work with Petrucci on polishing the lyrics to his song "You or Me". The whole band substantially reworked the song, and it appeared on the album as "You Not Me" with a chorus that bore little resemblance to the original. Child also had a noticeable impact on the album, with a shift towards less complex and more radio-friendly compositions.

The band wrote almost two CDs worth of material, including a 20-minute-long follow-up to the Images and Words song "Metropolis–Part I: The Miracle and the Sleeper". The label, however, did not allow the release of a double album because it felt that a 140-minute record would not be well received by the general public. James LaBrie also felt that the CD should be a single disc. The unused songs were later released in the YtseJam Records release The Falling into Infinity Demos.

The material that made it onto the album proper was released as Falling into Infinity, which received a mixed reception from fans who were more familiar with the band's earlier sound. While the album was moderately progressive-sounding, tracks such as "Hollow Years" and "You Not Me" prompted some to believe it was the dawn of a new, mainstream-sounding Dream Theater. Overall, the album was both a critical and commercial disappointment. Although Portnoy did not speak out publicly at the time, he later revealed in the 2004 DVD commentary for 5 Years in a Livetime that he had been so discouraged during this period that he had considered disbanding Dream Theater altogether.

During the European leg of the Touring Into Infinity world tour, two shows were recorded for a live album titled Once in a LIVEtime, in France and the Netherlands. The album was released at around the same time as the video 5 Years in a Livetime, which covered the years from Kevin Moore's departure to the Falling into Infinity promotional tour.

=== Derek Sherinian's termination, addition of Jordan Rudess, and Metropolis Pt. 2: Scenes from a Memory (1999–2000) ===
In 1997, Magna Carta Records' Mike Varney invited Portnoy to assemble a progressive "supergroup" to work on an album, which would become the first in a long string of side-projects for the members of Dream Theater. The lineup consisted of Portnoy on drums, Petrucci on guitar, Tony Levin on bass, and keyboardist Jordan Rudess, who had finished with the Dixie Dregs. The band assumed the name Liquid Tension Experiment, and would act as a medium through which Portnoy and Petrucci could once again court Rudess to join Dream Theater. In 1999, he accepted an offer to become the third full-time Dream Theater keyboardist, replacing Sherinian.

Dream Theater entered BearTracks Studio once again to write and record their next album. As a result of an ultimatum from Portnoy, the label gave the band complete creative control. The band began by revisiting the follow-up to "Metropolis–Part I", which had been partially written during the Falling into Infinity sessions but which had not been completed or used on that album. They decided to expand the 21-minute song into a complete concept album, with a story revolving around themes such as reincarnation, murder and betrayal. To avoid stirring up the fan base, a tight veil of secrecy enveloped the writing and recording process. The only things fans were privy to before its release were a track list that had been leaked against the band's wishes, and a release date. In 1999, Metropolis Pt. 2: Scenes from a Memory was released to high critical acclaim, being lauded as the band's magnum opus, despite only reaching No. 73 on the US album chart.

The album was mixed by David Bottrill, but only a few of his mixes made it on the final album. The bulk was remixed by Kevin Shirley, who had produced Falling into Infinity. The rest of the mixes can be heard in the band's official bootleg The Making of Scenes from a Memory.

The subsequent Metropolis 2000 world tour was by far their largest to date, and took over a year to complete. The concerts reflected the theatrical aspect of the album, with the first half of each show comprising the entire Scenes From a Memory album accompanied by a film showing dramatized portions of the story projected onto a video screen behind the stage. For the last date of the North American leg, at the Roseland Ballroom in New York City, actors were hired to play characters in the story, and a gospel choir was enlisted to perform in some sections of the performance. The show was filmed and eventually released in early 2001 as the band's first DVD release, Metropolis 2000: Scenes from New York, which was certified Gold in the US on November 8, 2002.

Since several songs from the second half of the four-hour show had to be cut from the DVD to save space, the band also released the full show on the live CD Live Scenes from New York. The original cover depicted one of Dream Theater's early logos (the Images and Words-era burning heart, modeled on the Sacred Heart of Christ) modified to show an apple (as in "Big Apple") instead of the heart, and the New York skyline, including the twin towers of the World Trade Center, in the flame above it. Coincidentally, the album was released on the same date as the September 11 attacks, leading to it being recalled and re-released with revised artwork later, although the few copies which were sold with the original artwork have become rare collector's items.

=== Six Degrees of Inner Turbulence (2001–2002) ===
"Overture"
Part one of the eight parts that constitute "Six Degrees of Inner Turbulence".

Dream Theater once again entered BearTracks Studios to record their sixth studio album. Four years after they first petitioned East West to allow them to release a double album, they finally got their chance with Six Degrees of Inner Turbulence. The first disc consisted of five tracks of 7–13 minutes in length, and the second disc was devoted entirely to the 42-minute title track, which remains to date the longest song Dream Theater has written. Many of the song's melodies and musical themes originated in an instrumental piece written by Rudess, which would eventually become the song's "Overture". Those themes were then expanded by the rest of the band to form individual chapters in a complete story.

Six Degrees of Inner Turbulence was very well received by critics and the press. It was the most publicized of Dream Theater's albums since Awake, debuting on the Billboard charts at No. 46 and the Billboard Internet charts at No. 1. The subsequent world tour included a select few special "album cover" gigs (see Cover songs section, below), in which they played Metallica's Master of Puppets and Iron Maiden's The Number of the Beast in their entirety.

=== Train of Thought (2003–2004) ===
In 2003, Dream Theater entered the studio to write and record another album. Unlike Scenes from a Memory, which had been written and recorded simultaneously in the studio, the band took a different approach by setting aside three weeks for writing prior to recording. In the middle of the recording sessions for the album, the band went on the "Escape from the Studio American tour", with Queensrÿche and Dream Theater as co-headlining acts and Fates Warning performing supporting act duties. As a finale for each concert, there was an extended encore in which both Dream Theater and Queensrÿche performed together on stage simultaneously, often playing cover songs.

After the tour, Dream Theater returned to the studio to finish the recording of their seventh album, Train of Thought. In contrast to the extended songs of their previous album, the band aimed to write a more song-oriented album, inspired in part by covering the Master of Puppets and Number of the Beast albums on their previous concert tour. Although the album was a critical success, its more straightforward metal sound alienated many of the band's existing fans, who had been attracted by the band's roots in progressive rock. They also re-released their first two live videos for the first time on DVD, titled Images and Words: Live in Tokyo/5 Years in a Livetime on June 29, 2004, through Rhino Records. This release was certified Platinum on March 22, 2006.

Another world tour followed, named the Train of Thought Tour. A North American tour was also completed in support of Yes, a band that had been a major influence on their own musical style. On March 6, 2004, during the North American leg of the tour, Dream Theater performed When Dream and Day Unite in full to celebrate its 15th anniversary, with original singer Charlie Dominici reuniting with the band for the encore alongside former keyboardist Derek Sherinian. After this Dream Theater continued to tour the world with their "An Evening With Dream Theater" shows. The latter were captured in another live CD/DVD release, recorded at the famous Nippon Budokan Hall in Tokyo, Japan. Live at Budokan was released on October 5, 2004, and was certified Platinum in the US on January 26, 2005.

=== Octavarium (2005–2006) ===
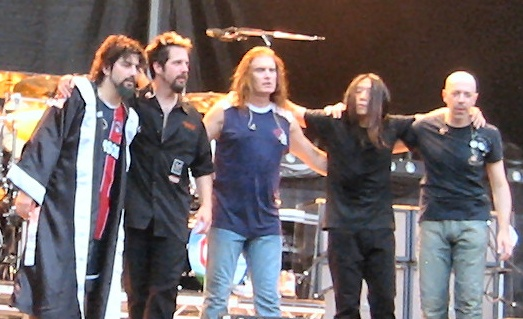
Dream Theater after a concert in Paris during the first European leg of their tour (2005). From left to right are Mike Portnoy, John Petrucci, James LaBrie, John Myung and Jordan Rudess.

After their Train of Thought promotional tour, Dream Theater entered the Hit Factory studios in NYC to record their eighth album. They would become the final group to use the famous studio, which closed on April 1, 2005.

Octavarium was released on June 7, 2005, and took the band's sound in yet another new direction. Its eight songs included a continuation of Portnoy's "Twelve-step" saga ("The Root of All Evil", steps 6–7 in the 12-step plan), as well as the title track, a musically versatile 24-minute epic rivaling "A Change of Seasons". Octavarium received mixed reviews from fans and has been the subject of spirited debate. Octavarium was the last album under their seven-album deal with Elektra Records, which had inherited the contract upon its absorption of EastWest Records.

Dream Theater started the Octavarium Tour, playing extensively throughout 2005 and 2006 to celebrate their 20th Anniversary as a band, including a headlining spot on Gigantour alongside Megadeth, also featuring Fear Factory, Nevermore and Symphony X. During a show on August 2, 2005, in Dallas, the band paid tribute to Pantera's late guitarist Dimebag Darrell by performing "Cemetery Gates" as an encore, joined in parts by Russell Allen (Symphony X vocalist), Burton C. Bell (Fear Factory vocalist) and Dave Mustaine (Megadeth vocalist/guitarist).

Dream Theater later departed from Gigantour 2005 a few dates before it ended and continued on with their own series of concerts, several of which were recorded and released for the band's fanclubs. The 20th anniversary tour concluded with a show at Radio City Music Hall in New York City on April 1, 2006. Though the show had minimal promotion, it was sold out days after tickets were made available. This show, which was recorded for a CD/DVD called Score released on August 29, 2006, through Rhino Records, featured songs from the band's entire history, as well a second half accompanied by a full symphony orchestra (the "Octavarium Orchestra"). This release was the band's third Live DVD release to be certified Platinum in the US on October 11, 2006.

=== Systematic Chaos and Greatest Hit (...And 21 Other Pretty Cool Songs) (2006–2008) ===
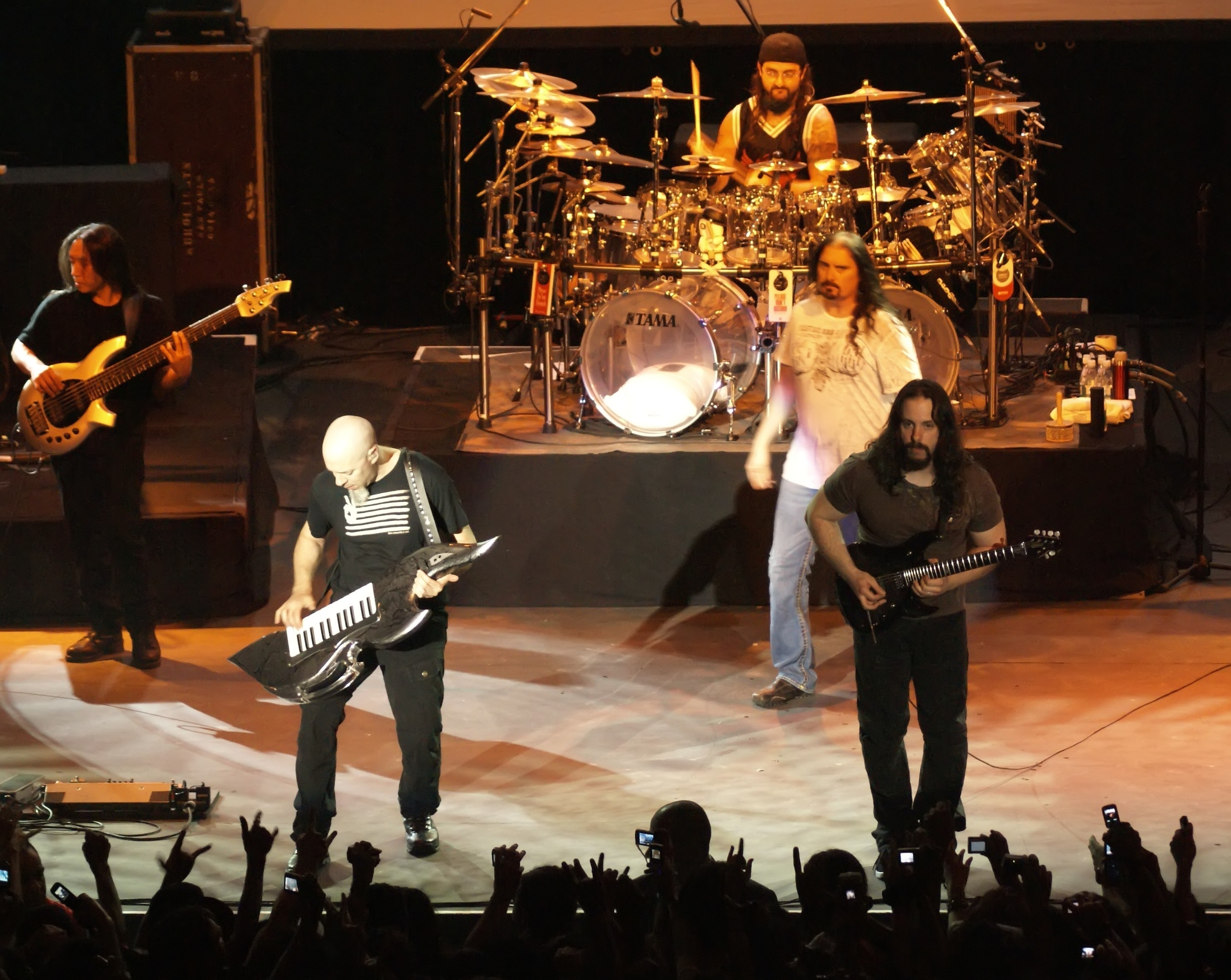
Dream Theater playing live March 8, 2008

For the first time in their career, the band took the summer off after their show at Radio City Music Hall. In September 2006, Dream Theater entered Avatar Studios to record their follow-up to Octavarium with studio engineer Paul Northfield. Dream Theater's ninth studio album, Systematic Chaos, was released on June 5, 2007. The record marked their first with new label Roadrunner Records, which in 2010 became a wholly owned subsidiary of the band's previous label Atlantic Records. Roadrunner implemented increased promotion for the album and Systematic Chaos reached number 19 on the Billboard 200. It also oversaw the release of a video for "Constant Motion" on July 14, the band's first since "Hollow Years" in 1997. The album was bookended by the two parts of "In the Presence of Enemies", written and conceived as a single piece but split into two halves for the purposes of the album. The other six tracks included the most recent part of Portnoy's continuing Twelve-step Suite with the song "Repentance".

In 2007, the first version of Rich Wilson's Lifting Shadows, an authorized history of the band's first twenty years, was released.

The 2007–2008 Chaos in Motion Tour started off in Italy. Dream Theater played in the Gods of Metal concert on June 3, 2007, as well as various other European festivals including the Netherlands' Fields of Rock Festival, UK's Download Festival, the French festival Hellfest Summer Open Air alongside Megadeth, Korn, Mastodon and Slayer. The North American leg of the tour began on July 24 in San Diego, California and wrapped up on August 26 in Philadelphia, Pennsylvania. They played with opening acts Redemption and Into Eternity. The Chaos In Motion Tour continued for the rest of the year and into 2008, playing shows in Asia, South America and, for the first time, Australia.

On April 1, 2008, a two-disc compilation album titled Greatest Hit (...and 21 Other Pretty Cool Songs) was released by the band. The title jokingly references the song "Pull Me Under", the band's only significant radio hit. It also includes three remixes from Images and Words, five edited versions of previously released songs, and a track from a single B-side. Unlike most greatest hits compilations, Dream Theater was actively involved with the album, coming up with the track listing that they felt best represented their musical careers.

After the release of Greatest Hit, drummer Mike Portnoy organized a new tour called Progressive Nation 2008. Unlike previous Dream Theater tours, performances were held in cities that they had not visited before (such as Vancouver, British Columbia, Canada) or cities they had not played in for several years. This tour also marked the first time since the release of Images and Words where the group performed in small venues and performance halls.

In September 2008, the band released a DVD set called Chaos in Motion 2007–2008, featuring songs recorded at several shows during the Chaos in Motion tour.

=== Black Clouds & Silver Linings (2008–2010) ===
On October 7, 2008, Dream Theater returned to Avatar Studios to begin work on their tenth album, resuming their relationship with Paul Northfield to engineer and mix the record. The album, titled Black Clouds & Silver Linings, was released on June 23, 2009. In addition to the standard CD, the album was made available on vinyl LP, as well as a 3-disc Special Edition CD that includes the full album, a CD of instrumental mixes of the album and a CD of six cover songs from artists such as Queen and Rainbow. On July 1, 2009, the album debuted at No. 6 on Billboard's Top 200 album chart, with first week sales totalling 40,285, making their highest entry on the chart. The album featured "The Shattered Fortress", the last in Mike Portnoy's series of songs about his 12-step recovery from alcoholism, as well as the song "The Best of Times", described by Portnoy as "a real heavy personal subject about my dad who passed away during the making of the album ... He was battling cancer throughout its making."

The band also embarked on a second Progressive Nation tour, including the tour's first performances in Europe. Opeth, Unexpect and Bigelf supported Dream Theater in Europe, while Zappa Plays Zappa, Pain of Salvation, and Beardfish were slated to perform on the North American leg. However, Pain of Salvation and Beardfish were unable to tour with Dream Theater and Zappa Plays Zappa because of financial troubles within their respective record labels. The two new bands that filled the vacated slots for the Progressive Nation 2009 tour in North America were Bigelf and Scale the Summit, with Bigelf performing on both European and North American legs.

After the Progressive Nation Tour, Dream Theater re-entered the studio to write and record a brand new instrumental track for inclusion on the God of War III soundtrack EP God of War: Blood & Metal. The track, titled "Raw Dog" (God (of) War reversed), marked the first time that the band has written and recorded an exclusive track for an outside project. "Raw Dog" includes the first ever commercially recorded harpejji track, performed by Jordan Rudess, as well as Dream Theater's final recorded performance with Mike Portnoy on drums prior to his departure from the band in 2010. In December 2009, during their Black Clouds & Silver Linings tour whilst visiting Australia, Dream Theater appeared with Pain of Salvation. In March 2010, they toured South America with Bigelf. Afterwards, during the summer of 2010, Dream Theater supported Iron Maiden on the US and Canadian legs of their summer tour, which were the last shows DT played during 2010.

=== Mike Portnoy's departure and Mike Mangini's arrival (2010–2011) ===
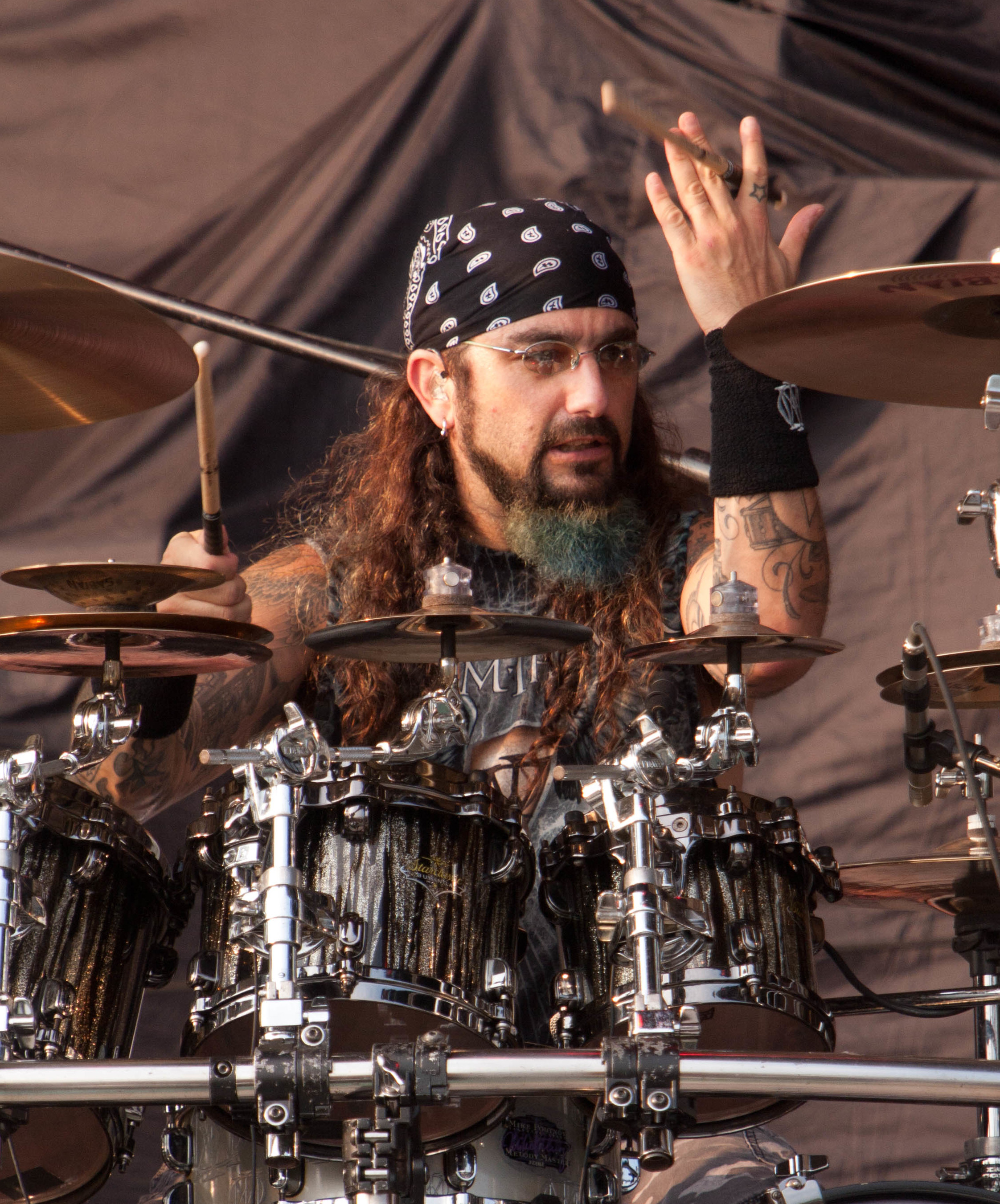
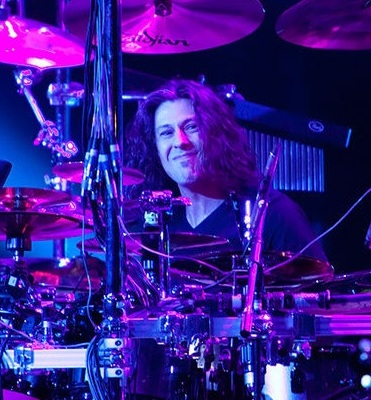
Drummer Mike Portnoy announced his departure on September 8, 2010, and was superseded by Mike Mangini, who remained until Portnoy rejoined in 2023.

On September 8, 2010, drummer Mike Portnoy announced that he would be leaving Dream Theater, citing better relationships in other projects, burnout, and his desire for a break as reasons. Elaborating on the situation for MusicRadar, John Petrucci revealed that originally, Portnoy did not want to leave the band; he only wanted to take a five-year break. He eventually dropped this number to around one year. Only after the rest of the band rejected his proposal did Portnoy decide to quit.

After Portnoy left Dream Theater, relationships between him and his former bandmates became strained. In February 2011, Portnoy complained that no one from the band was returning his calls and e-mails. However, later Portnoy commented that both Petrucci and Rudess were the only members that stayed in touch with him. Tensions became especially high when Portnoy called James LaBrie "disrespectful" for comments LaBrie made during an interview, stating that Dream Theater were "not sad at all" that Portnoy was no longer a band member. By July 2011, LaBrie had not remained in touch with Portnoy. Portnoy later stated that he would rejoin the band in a heartbeat, stating: "They are the ones that have closed the door on it. I've only needed a break, and I've had that break. So I'm ready, willing and able. But I honestly don't think they ever will; they've closed their door on it and I think they're too headstrong in having to prove themselves without me. So I wouldn't count on it. But my door is always open."

A little more than a month after Portnoy's departure, Dream Theater began auditioning for a new drummer in New York City. The drummers who auditioned were Mike Mangini, Derek Roddy, Thomas Lang, Virgil Donati, Marco Minnemann, Aquiles Priester, and Peter Wildoer. Fates Warning drummer Bobby Jarzombek was also invited to audition, but had to turn down the offer due to scheduling conflicts. The candidates were notified whether they had been chosen on November 5; however, the results of the audition were not made public until April 2011 via a three-part YouTube documentary series called The Spirit Carries On. In the last episode of the series, it was revealed that Mangini was the drummer selected. Petrucci later explained that Portnoy approached them to rejoin, but by this time they had already hired Mangini, who left his job as a professor at Berklee and committed to Dream Theater full-time, so Portnoy's offer was rebuffed.

=== A Dramatic Turn of Events (2011–2012) ===
Dream Theater entered Cove City Sound Studios to begin working on a new album on January 3, 2011. Writing was completed on March 2 and done without Mangini. On April 14, LaBrie began tracking vocals and by June 28, the album's mixing and mastering by Andy Wallace were finished. Released worldwide on September 12 and in the United States on September 13, A Dramatic Turn of Events debuted at number one in some countries and attained the eighth position on the Billboard 200, the band's second ever top ten debut position on that chart after Black Clouds & Silver Linings. Although the album received mixed reviews, it won numerous awards from music publications and its lead single, "On the Backs of Angels", was nominated for Best Hard Rock/Metal Performance at the 2012 Grammy Awards, representing the band's first ever Grammy nomination.

Dream Theater kicked off their tour in support of A Dramatic Turn of Events on July 4, 2011, in Rome, Italy. The second leg of the tour took place in North America, where the band headlined with Trivium. After a short break to conclude 2011, the band returned to Europe with Periphery, to Asia with Andy McKee, to North America with Crimson Projekct and then to South America for the final leg of the tour. On August 19 and 20, two shows were recorded at Luna Park in Buenos Aires, Argentina for a live Blu-ray release by Over the Edge Productions. After a six-month delay, Live at Luna Park was released on November 5, 2013, by Eagle Rock Entertainment. The tour concluded on September 1, 2012, in Brasília, Brazil.

On December 25, 2013, at 06:00:00 EST, as a holiday gift to the fans, Dream Theater released a free electronic 2-CD set of live tracks that were not recorded for Live at Luna Park from their 2011–2012 tour in FLAC format via BitTorrent. The release date and time were an allusion to their 1994 song "6:00", the intro of which contains a repeated sample of the line "Six o'clock on a Christmas morning" as spoken by Helena Carroll in The Dead.

=== Dream Theater (2013–2014) ===
Writing for Dream Theater's twelfth studio album commenced on A Dramatic Tour of Events. During soundchecks, the band would jam and record their ideas, and John Petrucci would bring in material he wrote independently. Following the conclusion of the tour, the band took a break but continued writing. They reconvened in early 2013 to enter the studio.

In December 2012, Dream Theater re-signed with Roadrunner Records. The band's self-titled twelfth album was released on September 23, 2013, as part of the new agreement with Roadrunner. The album sold more than 34,000 copies in its first week and landed on the Billboard 200 chart at No. 7, the band's third consecutive top 10 album. In addition, the album cracked the top 10 in 24 countries including Japan, Germany, Argentina, The Netherlands, Finland, Italy, Switzerland, Canada, Denmark, Norway, Austria, Australia and United Kingdom. The single "The Enemy Inside" was nominated for Best Metal Performance at the 2014 Grammy Awards, marking the band's second Grammy nomination.

Dream Theater's seventh live album, Live at Luna Park, was released on November 5, 2013.

On July 8, 2014, Dream Theater released The Studio Albums 1992–2011, a box set spanning all albums from Images and Words to A Dramatic Turn of Events.

On September 30, 2014, Dream Theater released their eighth live album and film, Breaking the Fourth Wall, which was recorded live from The Boston Opera House on March 25, 2014. During this concert, the band were joined by the Berklee World Strings and the Berklee Concert Choir, directed by Eren Başbuğ, for the second half of the set. The set list for the tour featured the entire second half of Awake in celebration of the album's 20th anniversary, including the song "Space-Dye Vest", which had never been performed live. The set list closed with a performance of four songs from Metropolis Pt. 2: Scenes from a Memory in celebration of the album's 15th anniversary. The Along for the Ride Tour concluded on October 30, 2014.

=== The Astonishing and Images and Words anniversary tour (2015–2017) ===
On January 6, 2014, John Petrucci said that Dream Theater were already "planting seeds for album No. 13". He commented: "There are some song ideas and little things like that -- nothing really official, but the seeds just start to get planted. One of the great things about this career is that you have the opportunity every time to go in and start again with a blank slate and think, 'What can we do differently? How can we make this better? Where can we go from here?' Every album has a story, and to constantly have a fresh opportunity to do it is really satisfying."

The band headed into the studio in February 2015 to record its thirteenth album. The album, titled The Astonishing was released on January 29, 2016. It is a concept album set in a dystopian future society devoid of real music, centering on a conflict between a group of rebels and an oppressive empire. Two singles, "The Gift of Music" and "Moment of Betrayal" were released on December 3, 2015, and January 22, 2016, respectively.

Throughout 2016, Dream Theater went on a tour titled The Astonishing Live to support the album. They played the album in its entirety, with an intermission between the two acts, only playing songs from earlier albums on occasions later in the tour. Their performance was accompanied by a visual representation of the story on background screens. The band also made it a point to play at indoor theater halls such as Radio City Music Hall. In 2017, Dream Theater went on another tour, titled Images, Words & Beyond, to commemorate the 25th anniversary of Images and Words. Each night they performed the album in its entirety, as well as "A Change of Seasons", which was originally written during the Images and Words sessions, and other selections from their catalogue.

=== Distance Over Time and Metropolis Pt. 2: Scenes from a Memory anniversary tour (2017–2019) ===
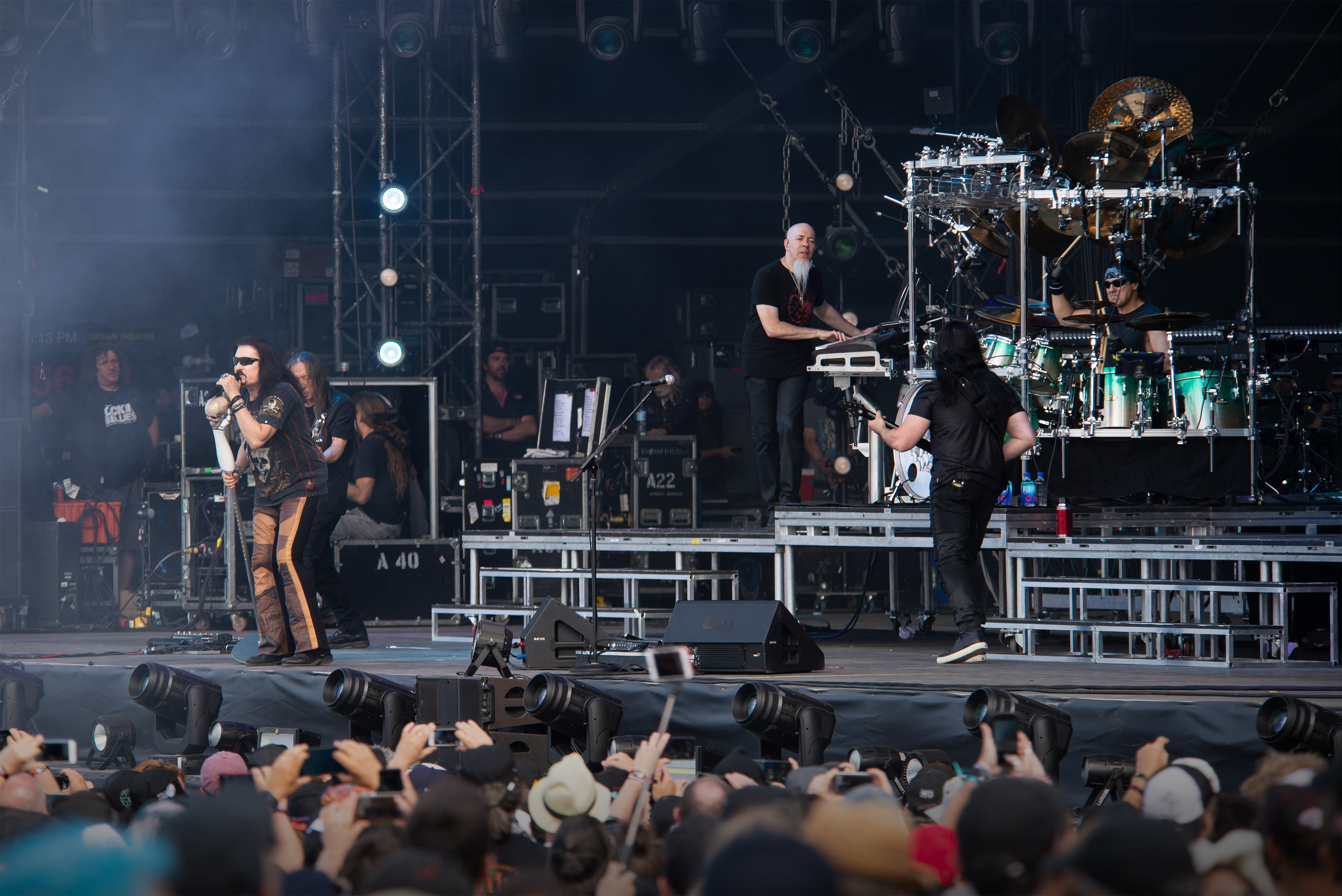
Dream Theater performed at Hellfest in 2019.

In a May 2017 interview with Rockbook, frontman James LaBrie talked about the style of the band's fourteenth studio album: "It's really important for us that the new album will be our best effort. It should be who we are at that particular moment. [...] But if along the way we feel that there is another album we should recognize once again, then we'll do it." In December 2017, Dream Theater announced that they had signed a worldwide longterm deal with Sony Music via Sony's progressive music label imprint Inside Out, for the release of the album.

The album was written in June and July 2018, and features pieces written collectively and lyrics written by Petrucci, LaBrie, Myung and, for the first time ever, Mangini. In anticipation of the album, the band launched a "treasure hunt" in the form of an alternate reality game, where participants would search for various clues across the internet. The game ultimately led to a site revealing the title of the album to be Distance Over Time. The site also revealed the cover art for the album, its scheduled release date in February 2019, as well as dates for a tour in North America celebrating the 20th anniversary of the band's fifth album Metropolis Pt. 2: Scenes from a Memory. On November 6, 2018, a press release from Inside Out officially announced Distance Over Time, with a release date of February 22, 2019. Upon release, the album received widespread critical acclaim.

=== A View from the Top of the World and Lost Not Forgotten Archives (2020–2023) ===
In April 2020, Metal Addicts reported that Dream Theater was expected to begin working on their fifteenth studio album in 2021. About the direction of the album, guitarist John Petrucci stated in an August 2020 interview with Ultimate Guitar: "The eight-string project with Ernie Ball Music Man is something we are working on and hoping to have developed as this year goes on. I'm hoping that on the next Dream Theater record I'll be able to explore that." This would later be confirmed in an interview with Ultimate Guitar in February 2021. Also in August 2020, Petrucci also told Spain's Metal Hammer that the band would begin working on their new album in the fall. Recording sessions started at DTHQ (the band's own studio) in October 2020. The band was confirmed on November 27, 2020, to be writing the songs, while LaBrie was writing his parts back home in Canada. When asked in an interview, Petrucci said that the writing sessions were "off to a great start".

Petrucci released his first solo album in fifteen years, Terminal Velocity, on August 28, 2020. The album was recorded at DTHQ earlier the same year. Its recording sessions marked the first time in ten years that Petrucci worked with his former Dream Theater bandmate Mike Portnoy, who played drums on all tracks from the album. This collaboration led to speculation of a Dream Theater reunion with Portnoy, which was denied by Petrucci, who told Metal Hammer: "I understand where people are coming from with that. One of the concerns I had, a little bit – not musically at all – but about Mike, is I didn't want people to get the wrong idea."

On November 27, 2020, Dream Theater released their ninth live album, Distant Memories – Live in London, recorded at Hammersmith Apollo prior to the COVID-19 pandemic. On December 1, 2020, the band released the single "The Holiday Spirit Carries On", a medley of holiday songs played in a progressive metal style, exclusively through Bandcamp. The title references the fan-favorite song "The Spirit Carries On" from Scenes from a Memory. The proceeds from sales of the single benefited the band's road crew. On January 30, 2021, Dream Theater held a special streaming event titled Images, Words & Beyond Live in Japan, an online broadcast of a concert from the band's 2017 tour, which was originally recorded for Japanese television.

On May 5, 2021, Dream Theater announced a series of albums titled the Lost Not Forgotten Archives, the first release of which is the second set of the Images, Words & Beyond Live in Japan concert. The band said that the Lost Not Forgotten Archives will eventually include every YtseJam Records release on CD, vinyl and digital formats, along with previously unreleased archival material.

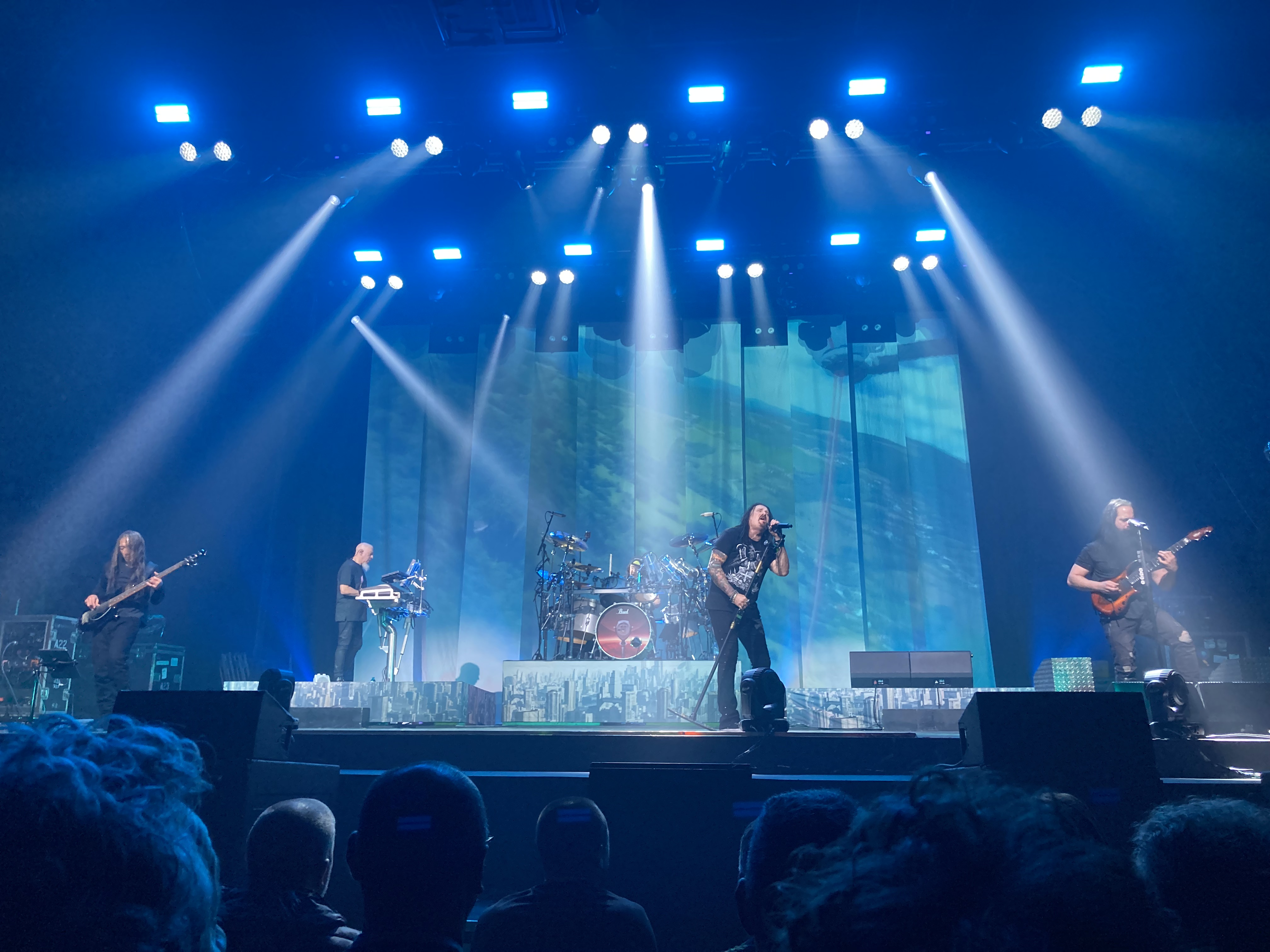
Dream Theater performs live in 2023.

Dream Theater teased the new album on July 26, 2021, revealing that it would have seven songs, with more details to be released on July 28, 2021. On July 28, it was announced that the album was titled A View from the Top of the World, and it was released on October 22, 2021. The album was supported by five singles, "The Alien", "Invisible Monster", "Awaken the Master", "Transcending Time" and "Answering the Call", and music videos were released for each of them. The band promoted the album with a concert tour of Europe from April 20 to June 1, 2022. They had previously announced a tour of North America from late October to mid-December 2021 on the same day as the album, but announced on September 27 that it had been rescheduled to early 2022, due to safety concerns related to the COVID pandemic. The rescheduled tour began on February 2, 2022, in Mesa, Arizona, with Arch Echo as a special guest.

A View from the Top of the World's lead single "The Alien" won a Grammy Award for Best Metal Performance at the 2022 Grammy Awards, marking Dream Theater's third nomination and first ever Grammy Award.

The band started the inaugural run of Dreamsonic, Dream Theater's own traveling progressive metal festival which also featured Devin Townsend and Animals as Leaders, on June 16, 2023. As described by John Petrucci: "Dreamsonic promises to be a reoccurring musical event that will deliver history-making nights of amazing music for many years to come!" The tour ended on July 26.

=== Mike Mangini's departure, Mike Portnoy's return and Parasomnia (2023–2025) ===
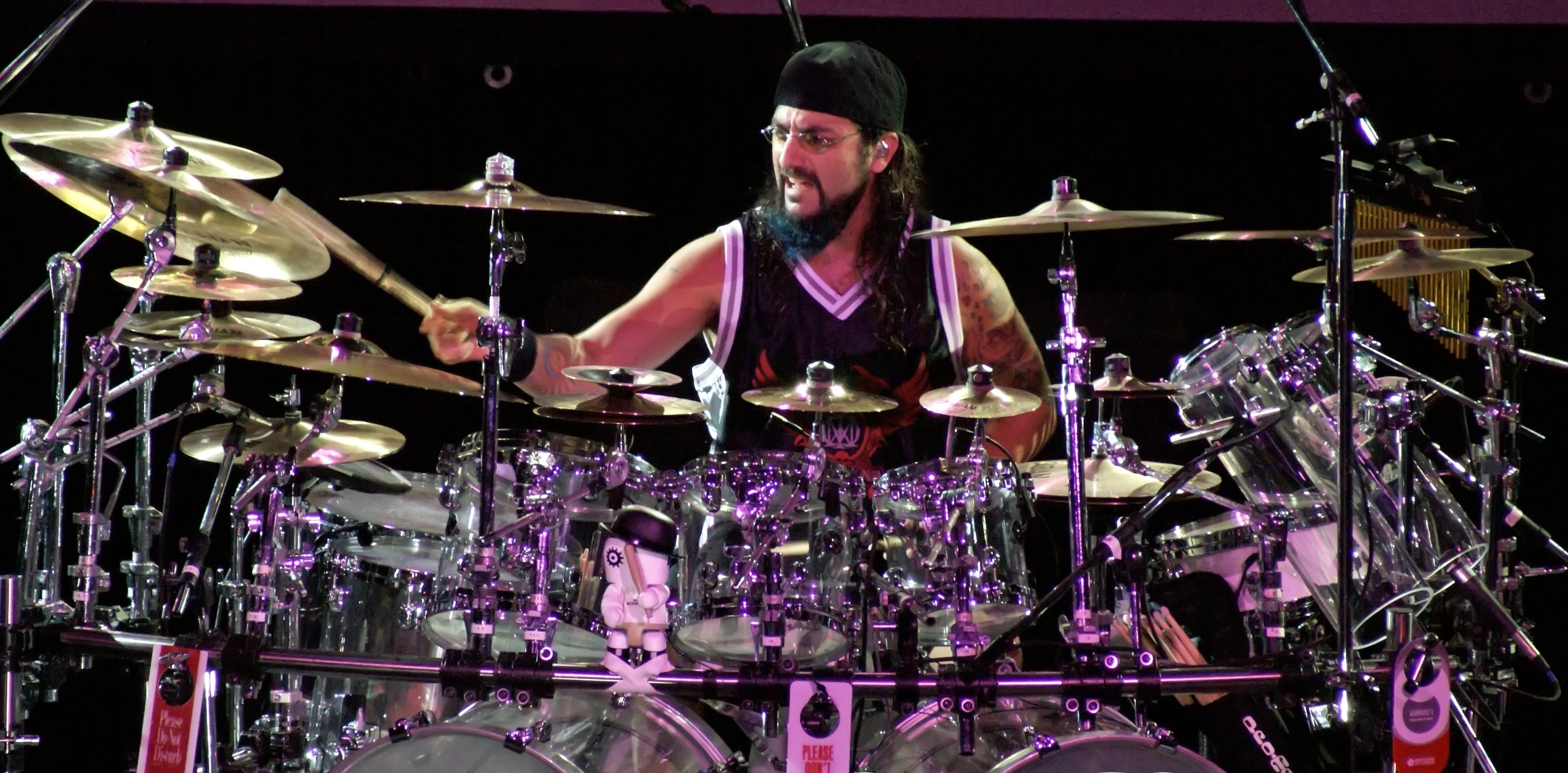
Original drummer Mike Portnoy rejoined Dream Theater in October 2023 after thirteen years out of the band.

In August 2023, John Petrucci said that studio time for their sixteenth album would begin in late 2023, though James LaBrie later said it would be more likely the beginning of 2024. On October 25, 2023, Dream Theater announced the departure of Mike Mangini, being replaced by a returning Mike Portnoy, with plans to record the first album with Portnoy in fifteen years. The reunion resulted from years of gradual reconciliation between Portnoy and individual members of the band, as he disclosed in an interview with Drumeo:

"Starting with John Petrucci maybe five, six, seven years ago or so, we just reconnected—John decided he wanted to do a solo album and he asked me to play on it—So I played on John's solo album. And then a few months later, we did a Liquid Tension Experiment album with John and Jordan. So that brought the three of us back together—And then I think the final piece was me reconnecting with James LaBrie, 'cause James and I hadn't spoken for over a decade. I went to see Dream Theater play [at the Beacon Theatre] in New York, I guess around 2022, and that was my first time seeing James in over a decade. And literally, I'm not exaggerating, within five seconds of seeing each other, it was hugs, kisses and it was like any of the drama and bullshit that happened during all of those years of the split, it just melted away immediately."

In a group interview with Rolling Stone, James LaBrie addressed his and Portnoy's reconciliation: "Mike and I are both very emotional and passionate people. And I think that led to the reason for us not coming together until we did. But as soon as I saw him, like he said, I came out of my dressing room, I saw him, and I was like, 'Come here.' And I gave him a fucking hug. And that was it." Petrucci added: "When Mike left the band, it was traumatic for all of us. We had to figure out how we were going to move our career forward. And those years that went by, they were also healing years because you don’t just have something like that happen, and all of a sudden, you're all best buddies a week later. There's some trauma there that had to heal. Thirteen years was enough time for that to happen and be like, 'Hey, you know what, man? We love each other like we're brothers.'" Mangini spoke amicably about his departure: "[M]y place was not to fill all the roles that Mike held in the band. I was to play the drums in order to help the band carry on. My main role of keeping our live show working tightly on a nightly basis was an intense and rewarding experience. Thankfully, I got to experience playing music with these iconic musicians, as well as some fun times laced with humor."

On November 17, 2023, the band announced former lead vocalist Charlie Dominici died at the age of 72.

In February 2024, Mike Portnoy posted pictures from DTHQ on his Instagram account, confirming that the new Dream Theater album was "officially underway". On April 2, John Petrucci and Portnoy announced that all of the writing and the drum tracks were completed. Petrucci later posted a video on YouTube on May 1, confirming that the guitar tracks were completed. On June 26, Jordan Rudess announced on his Instagram that all the keyboard parts had been recorded. On July 30, James LaBrie posted on his Instagram a photo of himself in the studio with the caption "Vocals" and a green check mark, with the hashtag "DT16", signifying the vocals had been completed for the new album.

On October 10, 2024, Dream Theater released "Night Terror" as the first single for their sixteenth studio album Parasomnia, which was released on February 7, 2025. The album was highly anticipated, with several publications, including Loudwire, Stereogum and Ultimate Guitar, naming it in their lists of the most anticipated albums of 2025.

Dream Theater announced they would embark on a tour supporting the album on May 20, 2025. In addition to performing the Parasomnia album in its entirety, the band confirmed they would also perform their composition "A Change of Seasons" on the tour; in an Instagram post, Portnoy speculated the tour would likely be the last time the band would ever perform "A Change of Seasons" live.

On November 7, 2025, Parasomnia's lead single "Night Terror" received a Grammy nomination for Best Metal Performance at the 2026 Grammy Awards, marking the band's fourth Grammy nomination and first ever nomination for Portnoy.

A new Dream Theater live album and Blu-ray, titled Quarantième: Live à Paris, was released on November 28, 2025. It was recorded live at the Adidas Arena in Paris, France on November 23, 2024 during the band's 40th anniversary tour of Europe. To mark the release, a special one-night showing of Quarantième: Live à Paris ran at AMC Theatres in select cities on November 17, 2025. A week prior to Quarantième: Live à Paris, the band released two box sets: The Studio Albums 1992–2016, a collection of CD reissues for their studio albums from Images and Words to The Astonishing, and Dream Theater Vol. 3, the final installment in the band's vinyl reissues series, containing pressings of all their studio albums from Black Clouds & Silver Linings to The Astonishing.

=== Upcoming seventeenth studio album (2026–present) ===
In May 2026, James LaBrie announced that Dream Theater would likely begin writing new material for a seventeenth studio album later in the year or in early 2027: "Right now the focus is we're on this world tour. We're gonna be on the world tour until — what? — mid-May. And that's the focus. Then we're gonna take a break for a little bit. And then probably late '26 or early '27 we'll get in to start writing and recording a new album. And then hopefully late '27 or early '28 we'll go back out with a new tour. And this is just — this is all not concrete. But this seems to be the idea at this point." That same month, Portnoy confirmed that the band would begin recording their next album in the fall: "We will take the summer off (although I do have about a months' worth of shows [with Neal Morse Band] in Aug/Sept) and then DT will reconvene in the studio in the fall to start work on another album and then we can start the whole thing all over again!"

On October 13, 2026, Dream Theater posted a photo on social media of all the band members together at Ytse Jam Studios, with the caption reading "#DT17 is underway...".

== Live performances ==
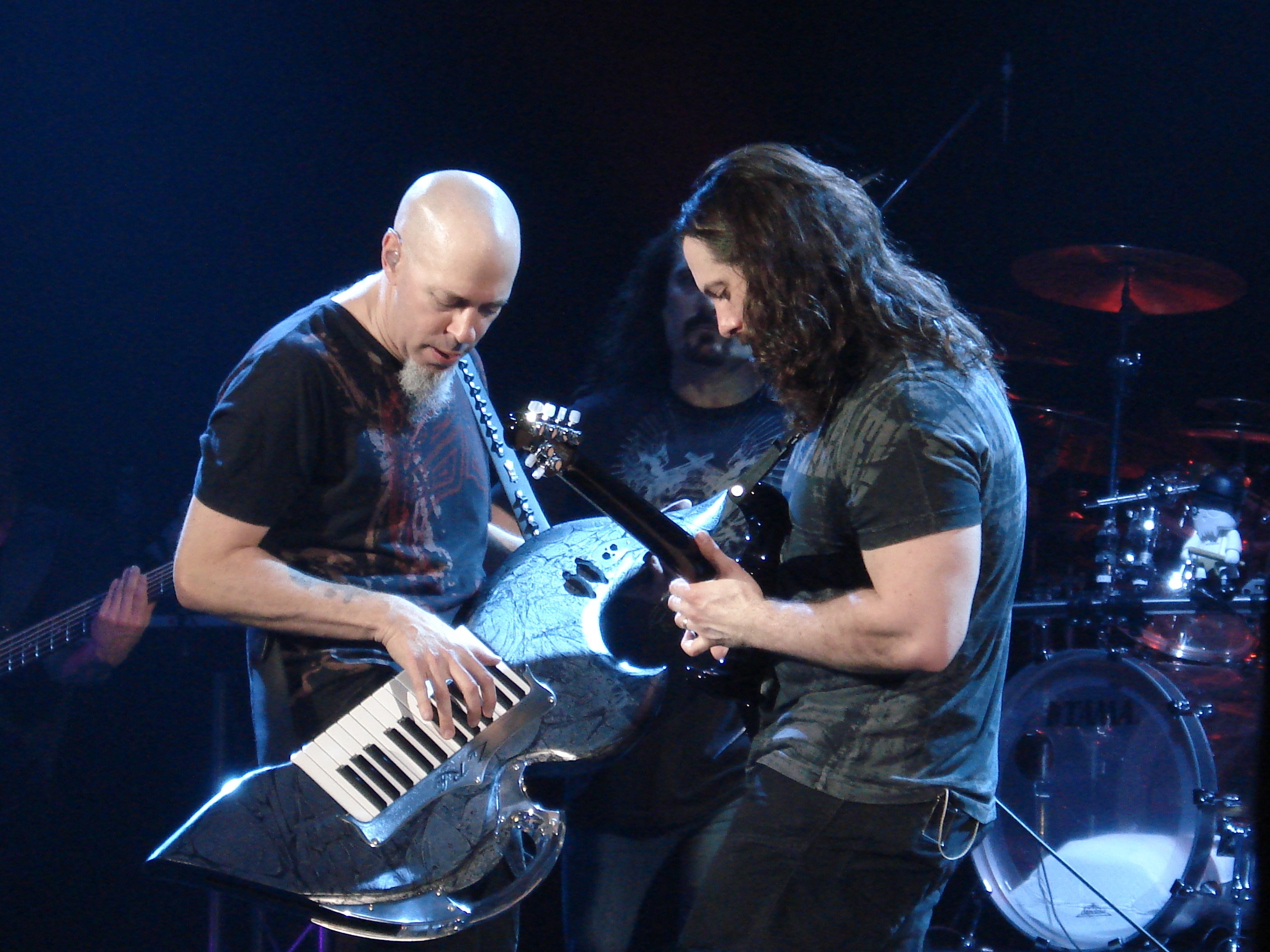
Rudess and Petrucci duet in Buenos Aires, Argentina (2008).

Throughout their career, Dream Theater's live shows have gradually become bigger, longer and more diverse. Prior to Portnoy's departure, Dream Theater "rotated" its set lists to ensure that fans who attended multiple shows in the same area would see few, if any, songs repeated. Portnoy, who constructed the set lists, would take into account the set list from the last time the band was in a particular city for the benefit of fans who saw the band on successive tours. The practice was abandoned with Portnoy away from the band, and the setlist remained static even after his return on the 40th anniversary tour, but Portnoy noted that the practice of rotating setlists would return eventually, and in July 2025 James LaBrie disclosed that it has been fully reinstated.

The band's full world tours, since Six Degrees of Inner Turbulence, have predominantly been "Evening with..." tours, in which the band performs for at least three hours without an opening act. Until 2012, such tours did not contain an intermission, but every tour since the Along for the Ride Tour in 2013–2014 until the Distance Over Time Tour had. The show that was recorded for Live Scenes from New York was well over three hours in length, and resulted in Portnoy almost being hospitalized after acquiring severe food poisoning from the food he ate before the show.

"Twinkle Twinkle Little Star"
"Twinkle, Twinkle, Little Star", live at Nagoya, Japan.

Dashes of humor, casualness, and improvisation are often attached to Dream Theater's concerts. For example, the performance of "A Change of Seasons" on Live Scenes from New York features changes to a series of instrumental breaks, with Myung playing a baseball organ melody, Petrucci playing the opening theme to The Simpsons, and Rudess playing the ragtime section of "When the Water Breaks" from Liquid Tension Experiment 2 (the latter is also heard on the album Live at Budokan). Several songs included on Once in a LIVETime include snippets of others' pieces, such as Lynyrd Skynyrd's "Free Bird" and Rimsky-Korsakov's "Flight of the Bumblebee." Other quotations include "Mary Had a Little Lamb" during "Endless Sacrifice" on the Gigantour, a calliope-inspired break between verses of "Under a Glass Moon", a quote of "Don't Cry for Me, Argentina"'s main melody played by Petrucci while performing the intro solo of "Through Her Eyes" in Buenos Aires, the Turkish March at a concert in Istanbul, and the opening riff of Rush's "A Passage to Bangkok" at a show in Bangkok, Thailand. On the "20th Anniversary World Tour", Rudess has even thrown in a short "Twinkle, Twinkle, Little Star" theme in a break during "Endless Sacrifice," and during a concert in Israel he started a spontaneous "Hava Nagila", with the rest of the band later joining in. During the band's 2017 tour, a snippet of Metallica's "Enter Sandman" was played during Dream Theater's own song "As I Am".

Dream Theater's most unconventional live shows were performed during Derek Sherinian's time with the band. At selected shows the band members all swapped instruments and performed an encore as the fictitious band dubbed Nightmare Cinema. They usually performed a cover of Deep Purple's "Perfect Strangers", and on one occasion, Ozzy Osbourne's "Suicide Solution". At some shows, Sherinian, Petrucci and Portnoy would take the stage together under the name "Nicky Lemons and the Migraine Brothers." Sherinian, wearing a feather boa and novelty sunglasses, would perform a pop-punk song titled "I Don't Like You" with Petrucci and Portnoy backing. During the Chaos in Motion tour, in several concerts before "Trial of Tears," Portnoy and Petrucci would switch instruments.

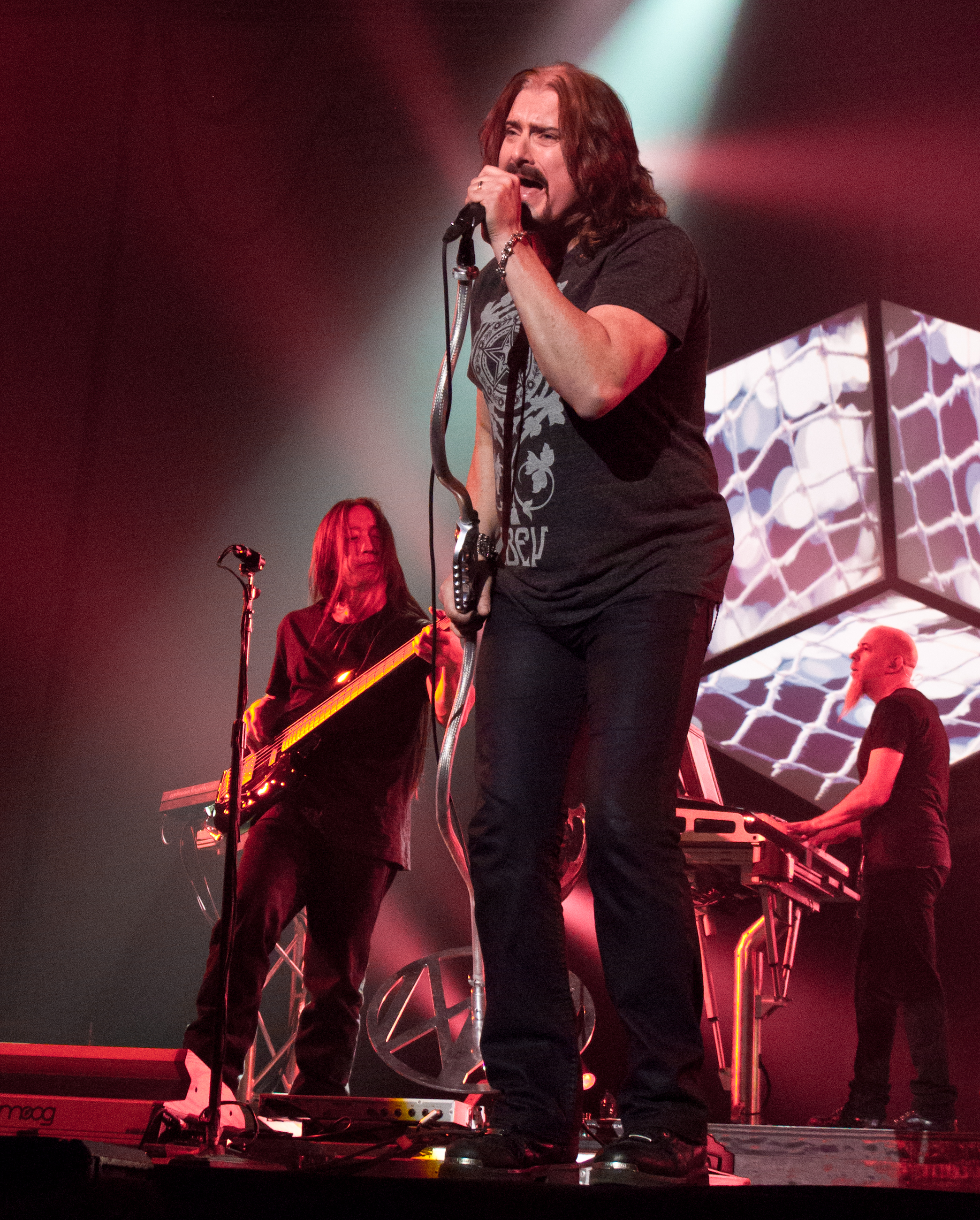
Concert of the A Dramatic Tour of Events in 2012. LaBrie in the foreground; Myung and Rudess in the background.

In the Score and Chaos in Motion DVDs, an animation has accompanied certain parts of the songs, showing the band playing along to the music as cartoon characters. On the Score DVD, during the song "Octavarium", the band is seen performing in an octagonal shaped maze. As the animation continues Jordan Rudess spontaneously turns into Santa Claus and John Petrucci catches fire. In "The Dark Eternal Night" from the Chaos in Motion DVD, the band battles against a monster by shooting fireballs from guitars, throwing drum sticks, and screaming.

=== Shows and concerts ===
Dream Theater played and recorded a live performance at the Nippon Budokan Hall on April 26, 2004. It was later released as Live at Budokan on October 5, 2004.

Dream Theater's largest audience as a headlining act was 20,000 in Santiago, Chile on December 6, 2005. The show was released on DVD through Portnoy's YtseJam Records.

In 2007, after their show in Salt Lake City on July 30, Governor Jon Huntsman, Jr. signed a proclamation officially marking July 30, 2007 as Dream Theater Day in the state of Utah.

In 2008 Dream Theater started the Progressive Nation 2008 tour, along with Opeth, Between the Buried and Me, and 3. The tour was the brainchild of Mike Portnoy, who stated, "I've been wanting to assemble a package tour like this for many years now. With all of the festivals and package tours that go through America, I've been talking with our manager and agent for over 10 years now about doing something that focuses on the more progressive, musician-oriented side of hard rock and metal. I decided it was time to stop talking the talk, lace up and finally walk the walk."

On February 13, 2009, Dream Theater announced the official line up for their Progressive Nation 2009 tour. The tour was originally set to feature bands including Swedish bands Beardfish and Pain of Salvation, as well as Zappa Plays Zappa. On June 22, 2009, Mike Portnoy announced that Pain of Salvation and Beardfish would not be touring the North American leg of the Progressive Nation 2009 tour because of record label complications. In the same announcement, Portnoy stated that the bands Scale the Summit and Bigelf would replace Pain of Salvation and Beardfish on the tour. This lineup change has put Bigelf on both the North American and European legs of the Progressive Nation 2009 tour. The tour's North American leg ran throughout July and August 2009. On March 26, 2009, it was announced that Dream Theater would take the Progressive Nation tour to Europe for the first time alongside Opeth, Bigelf and Unexpect. The tour ran throughout September and October 2009.

In June/July 2010 Dream Theater were the opening band for Iron Maiden during the first leg of their Final Frontier Tour which included Madison Square Garden as one of the many venues. On December 7, 2010, Dream Theater announced on their website that they would be headlining the High Voltage Festival alongside Judas Priest in 2011. In July 2011 they started A Dramatic Tour of Events to promote A Dramatic Turn of Events. In January 2014, they started the Along for the Ride Tour to promote their self-titled album. On December 13, 2016, Dream Theater confirmed 5 UK tour dates for their Images, Words & Beyond 25th Anniversary Tour, starting in Birmingham on April 18, 2017.

During the Images, Words & Beyond 25th Anniversary Tour, Dream Theater performed a cover of Soundgarden's "Black Hole Sun" on May 20, 2017, in Bucharest, Romania, to pay tribute to rock musician Chris Cornell who had died a few days prior. The cover featured only piano and vocals, with LaBrie forgetting a portion of the lyrics and instead singing "I forgot the fucking words" in line with the tune's melody.

Dream Theater kicked off the "Distance Over Time Tour" in March 2019. In addition to promoting the titular new album, the band also performed Metropolis Pt. 2: Scenes from a Memory in its entirety to celebrate the album's 20th anniversary.

On March 4, 2022, Mike Portnoy attended his first and only Dream Theater show as an audience member at the Beacon Theatre in New York City, taking photos with the band and receiving a shoutout from James LaBrie during the show. This attendance and backstage reconciliation with LaBrie ultimately led to Portnoy rejoining the band.

On April 22, 2023, Dream Theater announced the first edition of Dreamsonic, their traveling progressive festival, taking place in North America throughout June and July and celebrating the summer's ultimate progressive metal line-up. As described by John Petrucci: "Dreamsonic promises to be a reoccurring musical event that will deliver history-making nights of amazing music for many years to come!" Kicking off in Cedar Park, Texas, on June 16, 2023, the band was joined by special guests Devin Townsend and Animals As Leaders. The tour ended on July 26, and was Mike Mangini's last tour with the band. At the July 22 Dreamsonic show in Redmond, Washington, John Myung performed sitting down with a large bandage on his head with no explanation, with James LaBrie telling the crowd the band nearly cancelled the show. Myung later revealed in an interview he passed out at a border checkpoint due to dehydration and hit a metal post with his forehead that cut him open.

After rejoining Dream Theater, on April 8, 2024, the band announced their first tour with Mike Portnoy in fourteen years, titled the "40th Anniversary Tour 2024 – 2025", which began with a month-long European leg in the fall of 2024. The reunion with Portnoy kicked off at The O2 Arena in London, England on October 20, 2024. The show was described by the band as a very surreal and emotional experience, with LaBrie choking up and weeping onstage and had to briefly pause singing.

On December 24, 2024, Dream Theater performed the Christmas classic "O Holy Night" for the first time in 26 years to close-out the South American leg of the "40th Anniversary Tour 2024 – 2025" in Santiago, Chile, on the second night of back-to-back shows. On March 22, 2025, Dream Theater performed "The Best of Times" for the first time ever at their tour-closing concert at Radio City Music Hall in New York City, with special guest Jonathan Dinklage on violin.

On July 2, 2025, Dream Theater performed for the first time ever at the Amphitheatre of Pompeii in Pompeii, Italy, the same venue where Pink Floyd made their 1972 concert film Pink Floyd: Live at Pompeii. To mark the occasion, the band performed a cover of "Echoes".

The band began their Parasomnia Tour in Reading, Pennsylvania, on September 5, 2025. In addition to performing the Parasomnia album in its entirety, the band confirmed they would also perform their song "A Change of Seasons" on the tour. Mike Portnoy speculated that this tour cycle would likely be the last time the band would ever perform the song.

== Cover songs ==
Dream Theater have covered other artists' work throughout their career. They have performed cover songs live and in studio, with many of those live performances being recorded for official release. A Change of Seasons features Elton John, Deep Purple, Led Zeppelin, Pink Floyd, Kansas, Queen, Journey, Dixie Dregs and Genesis live covers. Through YtseJam Records, the band have also released full album live cover performances of Metallica's Master of Puppets, Iron Maiden's The Number of the Beast, Pink Floyd's The Dark Side of the Moon, and Deep Purple's Made in Japan. The special edition of Black Clouds & Silver Linings includes a bonus disc with Rainbow, Queen, Dixie Dregs, Zebra, King Crimson, and Iron Maiden covers. Other notable artists covered by Dream Theater include Black Sabbath, Ozzy Osbourne, Pantera, Rush, the Who, and Yes.

== Logo and imagery ==
Dream Theater wordmark and "Majesty" symbol

Despite the band being forced to change their name, Dream Theater adopted a custom logo (known as the Majesty symbol) and wordmark, both of which have appeared on most of their promotional material. The Majesty symbol has been featured on the front cover of every Dream Theater studio album, while the wordmark appears on all except Falling into Infinity and Dream Theater. The Majesty symbol is derived from Mary, Queen of Scots' mark, which was re-worked by Charlie Dominici for use on the album artwork for When Dream and Day Unite.

In September 2010, a fan of Dream Theater discovered that all of the letters of "DOMINICI" fit together perfectly into the Majesty symbol. When Charlie discovered this, he laughed and mentioned that "it only took them 25 years to figure out the 'Dominici Code!'" This has earlier also been discovered as shown on the comment section of DTFAQ and in the DTNorway Podcast Episode 2 from 2008, with Charlie Dominici.

== Musical style ==
AllMusic's Stephen Thomas Erlewine described Dream Theater's music as a "dense blend of progressive rock and post-Halen metal". The band is well noted for being one of the early progenitors of the progressive metal genre, and they are considered a member of the so-called "Big Three" of the genre, along with Queensrÿche and Fates Warning. The original members, Mike Portnoy, John Petrucci and John Myung, have strong influences from progressive rock bands such as Rush, Yes, and Pink Floyd; heavy metal bands such as Iron Maiden and Judas Priest; various speed metal bands; and glam metal. Petrucci described Dream Theater's musical style as a blend of Rush, Led Zeppelin, Iron Maiden, Yes, and Metallica, while Portnoy described their style as a blend of progressive rock, influenced by Rush, Yes, Pink Floyd, and Genesis; and heavy metal, influenced by Judas Priest, Iron Maiden, Metallica, and Black Sabbath. This synthesis created a unique sound that was not traditional of the day: it had distorted guitars and fast riffing, but the music focused more on technical proficiency and precise execution than on heavy metal riffs. The band's music has focused on three main elements: metal, melody, and progressive roots. Singer James LaBrie expressed that Dream Theater is more than just a progressive rock band, citing prog, metal, jazz fusion and pop as some of the styles that form the band's sound. In the liner notes for the 2008 Greatest Hit compilation, Portnoy cited artists such as Peter Gabriel, U2, and Journey as inspirations for Dream Theater's softer songs. The band's music has also been described as art rock. In regards to Dream Theater's unique identity as a progressive metal band, RockLists.com wrote, "Progressive metal has rarely had players this ferociously schooled: Petrucci's guitar races like an overclocked engine, Myung works a Chapman stick as well as bass, and the songs sprawl into suites that make a normal single look like a sneeze."

Dream Theater's 2003 album Train of Thought showcased a heavier sound. This decision was inspired by the positive feedback received from their previous heavier songs on stage. 1999's Metropolis Pt. 2: Scenes from a Memory was praised for its display of old-fashioned progressive rock, and was influenced by classic conceptual rock records such as the Beatles' Sgt Pepper's Lonely Hearts Club Band, Pink Floyd's The Wall and The Final Cut, the Who's Tommy, and Genesis's The Lamb Lies Down on Broadway.

Dream Theater's music usually borrows elements from other musical styles including symphonic rock, symphonic metal, arena rock, soft rock, and classical music.

== Band members ==
Dream Theater at Tons of Rock 2025

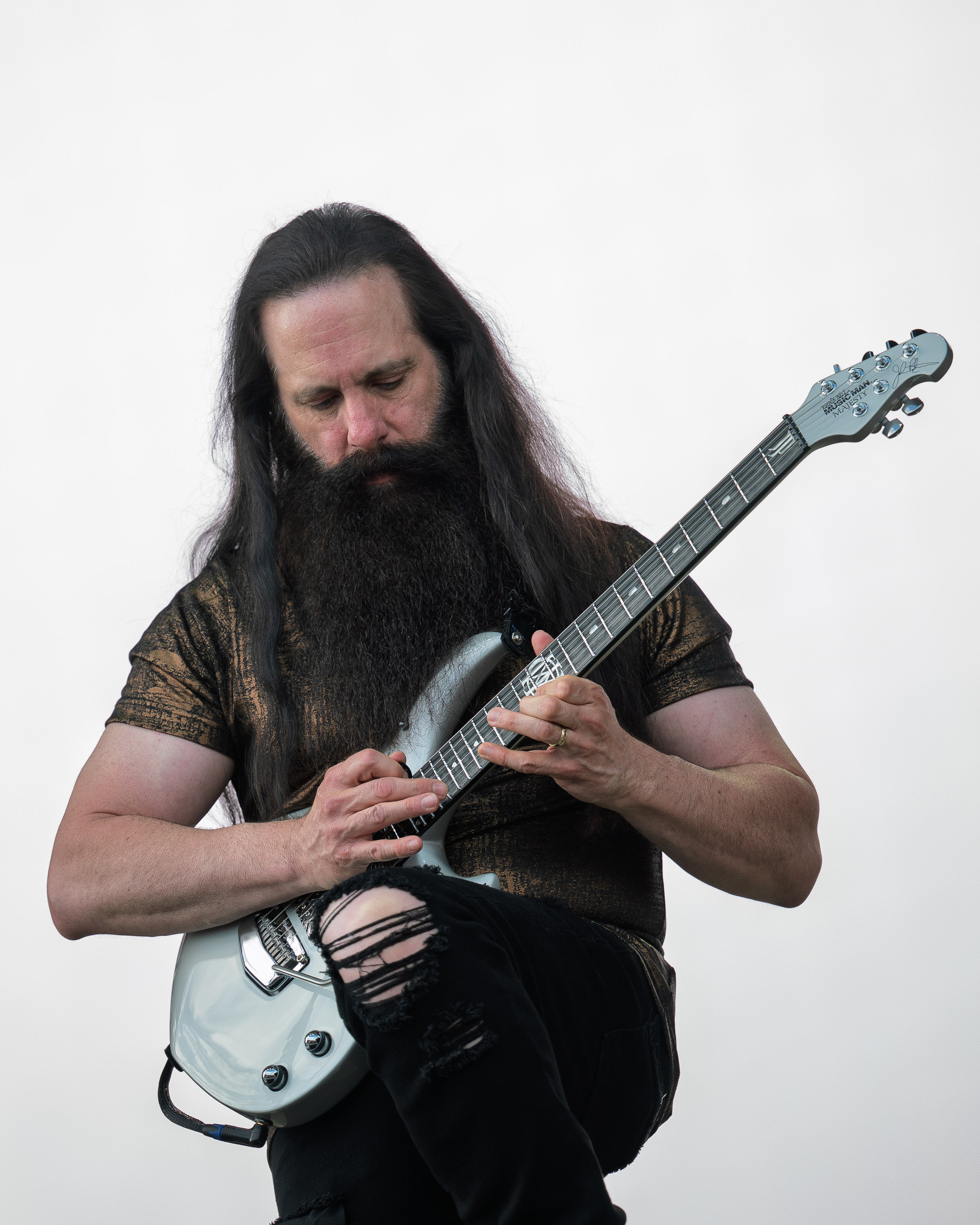
John Petrucci

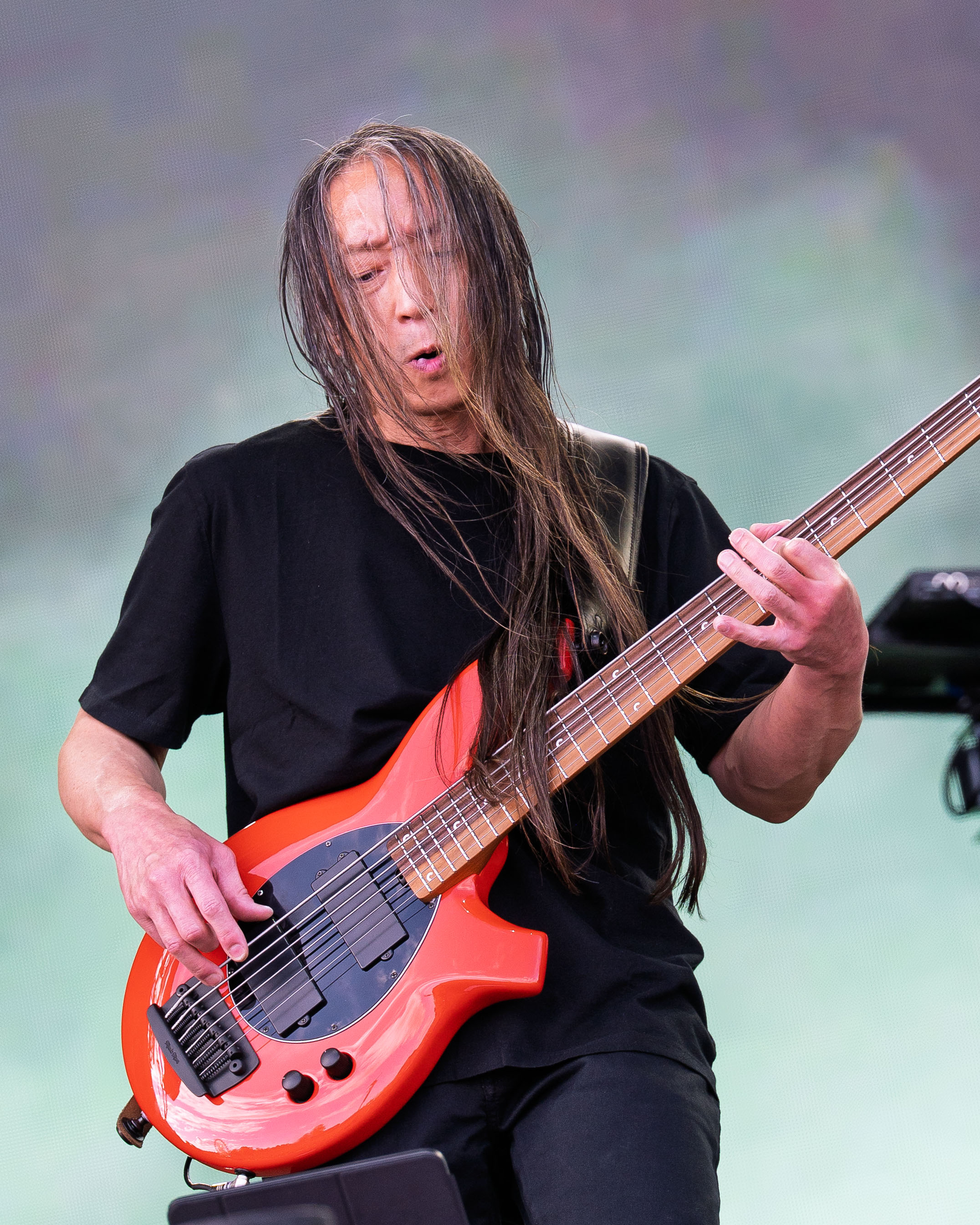
John Myung

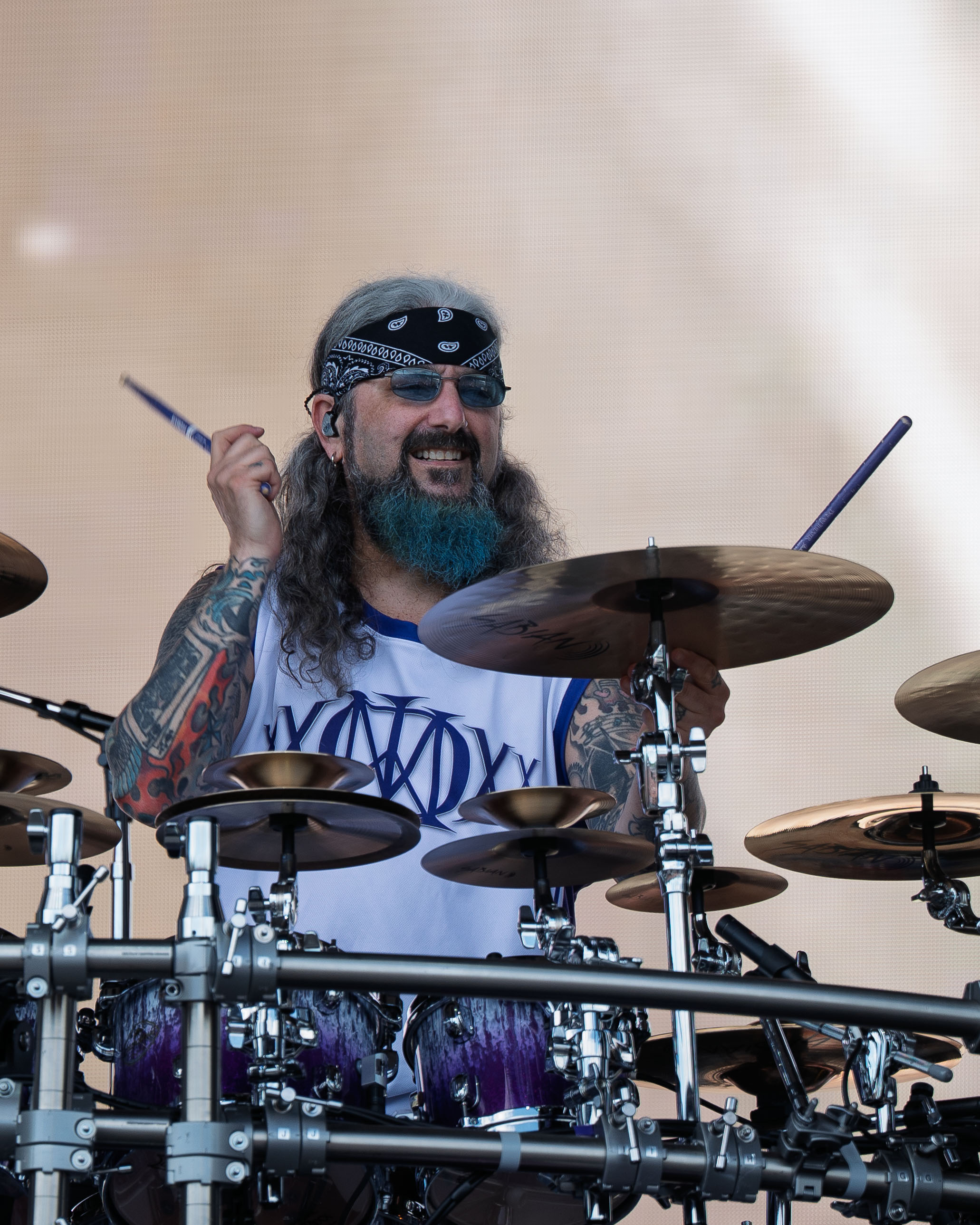
Mike Portnoy

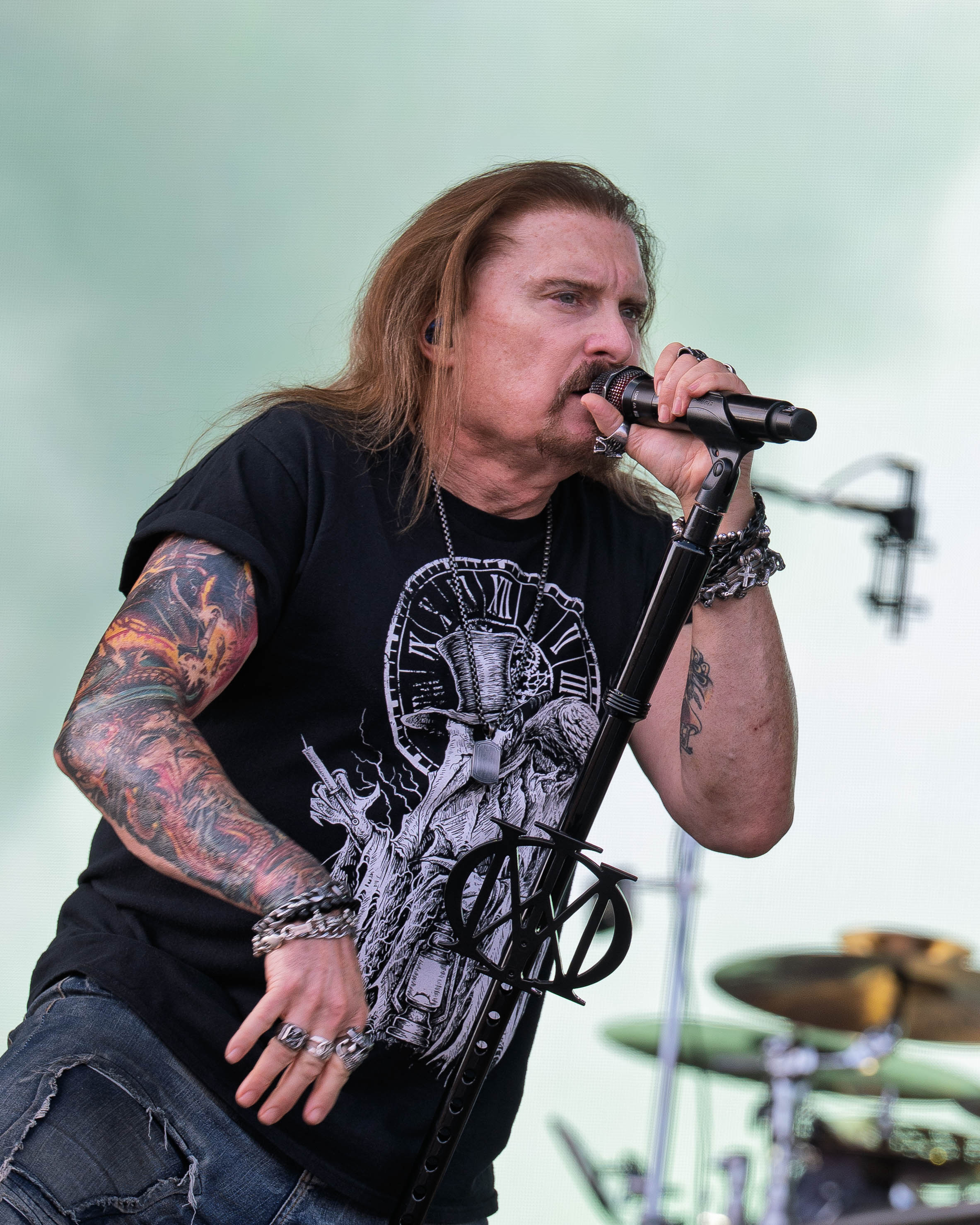
James LaBrie

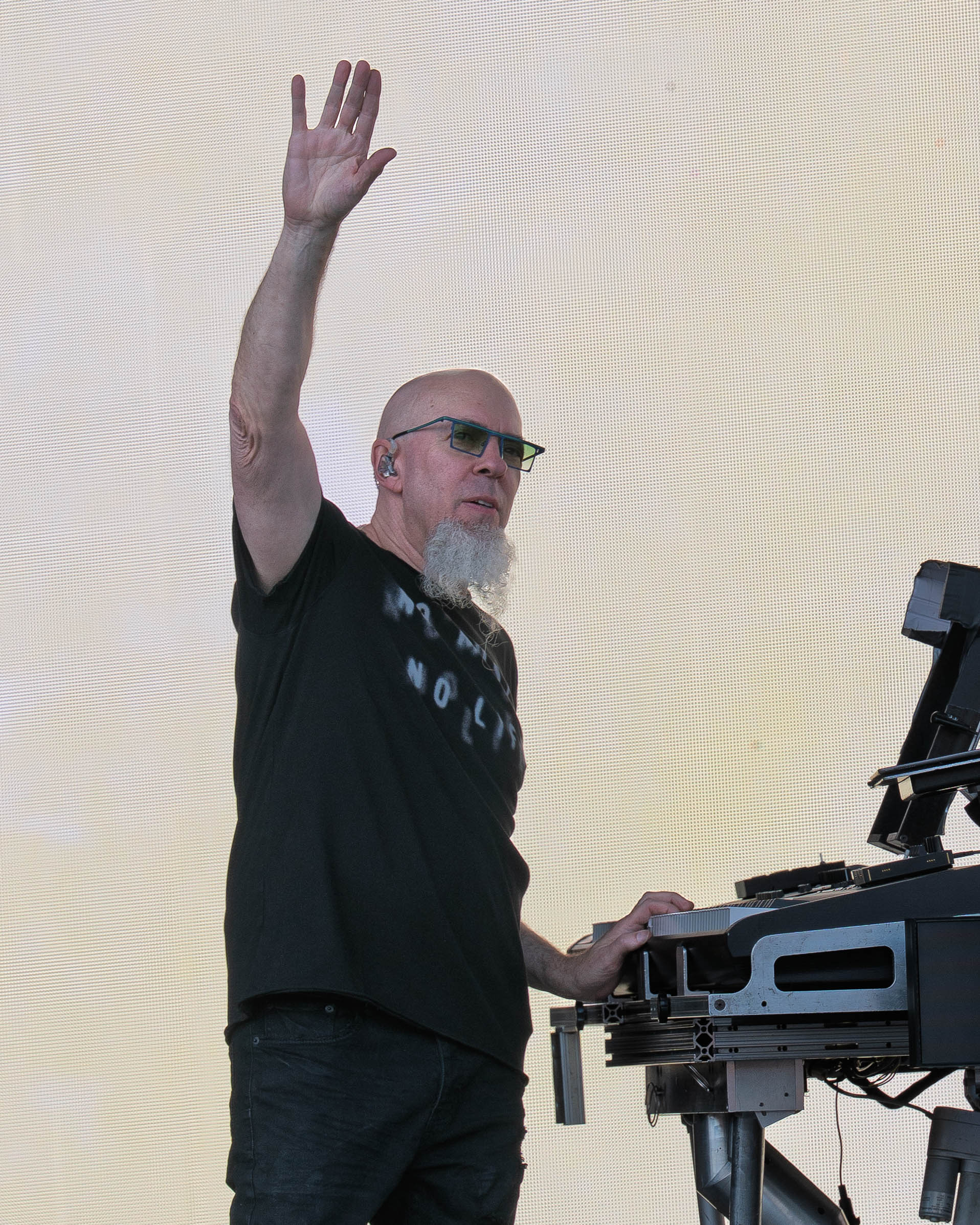
Jordan Rudess

Current

- John Petrucci – guitars (1985–present), backing vocals (1989, 1996–present)
- John Myung – bass guitar (1985–present)
- Mike Portnoy – drums, percussion (1985–2010, 2023–present), backing vocals (1989, 1996–2010, 2023–present)
- James LaBrie – lead vocals (1991–present)
- Jordan Rudess – keyboards, continuum, occasional guitar (1999–present)

Former

- Chris Collins – lead vocals (1986)
- Charlie Dominici – lead vocals (1987–1989, guest 2004; died 2023)
- Kevin Moore – keyboards (1986–1994)
- Derek Sherinian – keyboards (1995–1999, unofficial touring member beginning in October 1994, guest 2004), backing vocals (1997)
- Mike Mangini – drums, percussion (2010–2023)

== Discography ==
=== Studio albums ===
- When Dream and Day Unite (1989)
- Images and Words (1992)
- Awake (1994)
- Falling into Infinity (1997)
- Metropolis Pt. 2: Scenes from a Memory (1999)
- Six Degrees of Inner Turbulence (2002)
- Train of Thought (2003)
- Octavarium (2005)
- Systematic Chaos (2007)
- Black Clouds & Silver Linings (2009)
- A Dramatic Turn of Events (2011)
- Dream Theater (2013)
- The Astonishing (2016)
- Distance Over Time (2019)
- A View from the Top of the World (2021)
- Parasomnia (2025)

Dream Theater have also released a series of official bootlegs through YtseJam Records, at the time headed by Portnoy, as well as through The Lost Not Forgotten Archives, a reissue project in collaboration with InsideOut, which aims to reissue all YtseJam released alongside releasing previously unreleased archival material.

== Awards and honors ==
=== Grammy Awards ===
Year	Nominee / Work	Category	Result	Ref(s)
2012	"On The Backs Of Angels"	Best Hard Rock/Metal Performance	Nominated	
2014	"The Enemy Inside"	Best Metal Performance	Nominated	
2022	"The Alien"	Best Metal Performance	Won	
2026	"Night Terror"	Best Metal Performance	Nominated	
