= Awake (Dream Theater album) =

1994 studio album by Dream Theater

Studio album by Dream Theater
- Released: October 4, 1994
- Recorded: May–July 1994
- Studio: One on One and Devonshire Sound, North Hollywood
- Genre: Progressive metal; progressive rock
- Length: 74:56
- Label: East West
- Producer: John Purdell, Duane Baron

Dream Theater chronology
Live at the Marquee (1993)	Awake (1994)	A Change of Seasons (1995)

Singles from Awake
- 1. "Lie" Released: December 5, 1994; 2. "The Silent Man" Released: January 20, 1995

Awake is the third studio album by American progressive metal band Dream Theater, released on October 4, 1994, through East West Records. It is the final Dream Theater album to feature original keyboardist Kevin Moore, who announced his decision to leave the band during the mixing process of the album.

Much of the material for Awake was written in writing sessions between February and April 1994, during which Dream Theater were under pressure from their record label to produce an album as successful as Images and Words (1992) with a single similar to "Pull Me Under". The label wanted the band to produce a more metal-oriented album, hoping it would be easier to market. John Purdell and Duane Baron produced, engineered and mixed the album. The album's cover, again designed by Larry Freemantle, features numerous references to the album's lyrics.

Released at the height of the popularity of grunge music, Awake initially received mixed reviews, though the album was later referred to as one of the band's finest releases. The album peaked at 32 on the US Billboard 200, the highest position a Dream Theater album would reach on that chart until 2007's Systematic Chaos, which peaked at 19. "Lie" and "The Silent Man" were released as singles but failed to be as successful as "Pull Me Under" had been. The band's record label considered the album a commercial failure, which would lead to the band being pressured to write more radio-friendly songs on their subsequent studio album.

== Background ==
After a month-long break, Dream Theater started working on their third studio album in February 1994. The band's two-month writing sessions were located at Prince Studios, New York City. The lack of a leader within the band increased tensions in what were already tense sessions. Keyboardist Kevin Moore noted at the time that "there are arguments that last forever because there's nobody to come in and draw the line". "When it came to the music, you had [guitarist] John Petrucci and I playing the roles we still kind of play, and Kevin was also a forceful element," drummer Mike Portnoy said. "In those days, [bassist] John Myung was a little bit more out of his shell, so the bass was a bit more predominant in the band. The fighting never came to blows, but there was a lot of bickering over every single element, like the fine details of what the third note on the sixty-fourth bar should be."

The success of Dream Theater's previous album, Images and Words, particularly the single "Pull Me Under", put pressure on the band to produce a similarly successful follow-up album. "Somebody once said that you have your whole life to prepare for your first album and have about two months to prepare the follow-up, and that was very much the situation we faced in early 1994," Portnoy noted. The popularity of alternative metal and groove metal meant that the band's record label, East West, were keen for the band to create a heavier, darker album. Awake featured Petrucci's use of a seven-string guitar for the first time, establishing a more riff-based writing style. "This style would further cement the fusion of metal and progressive music, which is what Dream Theater are known for," Petrucci said. "I think it paved the way for many of our strongest and heaviest later songs like 'A Change of Seasons', 'The Glass Prison' and 'The Dark Eternal Night'." Vocalist James LaBrie described his vocals on Awake as "more varied and a lot more aggressive" than on Images and Words to the extent that people may think the band had a new singer for the album.

== Recording ==
The recording sessions for the album began in May 1994 at One On One Studios in North Hollywood, Los Angeles, with overdub work done at Devonshire Studios in Los Angeles. John Purdell and Duane Baron, whose credits included Ozzy Osbourne's No More Tears (1991), were hired to produce the album. The band, which had a difficult relationship with David Prater, who produced Images and Words, enjoyed working with Purdell and Baron. "I think everyone felt we were able to express ourselves a lot more genuinely," Petrucci said. "The experience from the road, learning more about our sound and what we like and don't like enabled us to be more prepared. The producers were totally into capturing that and being patient with us. So everybody walked away being completely satisfied with their performances and their sounds." Awake is the band's only studio album to date that was not recorded on the east coast of the United States.

=== Departure of Moore ===
Towards the end of the recording sessions, Kevin Moore announced to his bandmates that he was leaving the band. Petrucci, who was childhood friends with the keyboardist, found the news particularly hard to take. Myung noted that the announcement "didn't come out of the blue". LaBrie noticed changes in Moore at the end of the Images and Words tour. "He seemed to be more distant and wrapped up in himself... It wasn't that he was rude or unpleasant with anyone," he said. "But when Mike, John Petrucci and John Myung were in the rehearsal studio putting together the music for Awake, he wasn't there as he had been in the past. And when he was there, the guys told me he'd be sitting reading a magazine when they were trying to work out riffs." "After the record was recorded in Los Angeles, he returned to New York, sold his belongings, packed everything into his station wagon and said 'I'm moving away from Long Island,'" Dream Theater's co-manager Jim Pitulski recalled. "So I asked him where he was moving to, and he said, 'I'll let you know when I get there.' He really had no idea what he was doing and he just started driving across the country. I kind of admired that."

Moore stated that he decided to leave because his approach to writing music had changed. He had become more interested in writing and recording his own material. Myung said that Moore left the band out of "peace of mind and what he wanted to do musically that he couldn't do in the band". The band's business manager, Rob Shore, suggested that the idea of prolonged touring was a contributing factor in Moore's decision. Describing Moore as "a very private person", Portnoy thought that he might have left because "the whole machine of the music business just wasn't his cup of tea". When Moore announced his decision to leave, he was single, while LaBrie was married, Portnoy and Petrucci had girlfriends and Myung, according to Portnoy, "was kind of in his own world". Portnoy speculated that any resentment or jealousy Moore felt because of this may have influenced his decision. After leaving Dream Theater, Moore continued to release music, musically far-removed from his work with the band.

=== Mixing ===
Awake was mixed at Unique Studios, New York City. When mixing, Purdell, Baron and Miller were initially joined by the remaining members of the band. "We were all in the studio when it first started and it was just unfair to the producers," vocalist James LaBrie said. "Obviously each guy was focusing on his instrument, so it was like 'Wait, I want me up more!' So they were trying to please everyone and you just can't do that." The band had to be banned from the mixing sessions to allow Purdell and Baron to mix the album to a high enough standard. "The one great thing, though – even though we were out of the studio – was that they were aware of what we wanted and didn't want," LaBrie said. "When David Prater mixed Images and Words it was really unfortunate because he forgot to bring some sections out and he really didn't understand what we wanted from the final music. When Duane and John went in, they knew everything that needed to be there and how we wanted it to be represented."

== Songs ==
=== "6:00" and "Innocence Faded" ===
The album's opening track, "6:00", features lyrics written by Moore, hinting at the growing distance between him and the rest of the band. Petrucci wrote the lyrics of "Innocence Faded", inspired by his deteriorating friendship with Moore. "The way I wrote lyrics a lot of the time is that I'll take an initial spark of an idea... But then I'll kind of generalize and add in other situations," Petrucci said. "So I couldn't say it was solely about that, but it was definitely inspired by that. There was a feeling of it not being the same way it had been, and the realization that things were not always going to remain the same."

=== "Caught in a Web" ===
According to James LaBrie, "Caught in a Web" is about a protagonist that has finally determined to live the way they want, after being told by society they have to live their life a certain way. He says it deals with "... a person that's... it's not male or female, it could be either. And it's... a person who has suppressed their feelings for so long and has finally had enough of it and feels that the only way that they can really live life to its fullest is to live from the inside out. And that's basically what this person has come to terms with. And they're sick of society inducements and they feel the only way that they can go on with life is to live it the way they feel is the truth..."

=== "A Mind Beside Itself" trilogy: "Erotomania", "Voices", and "The Silent Man" ===
"Erotomania", "Voices" and "The Silent Man" form a three-part suite titled "A Mind Beside Itself". Portnoy stated that the instrumental "Erotomania" was written "off the cuff" as "a bit of a joke and parody". Petrucci penned the lyrics to "Voices", dealing with the subject of mental illness. He researched schizophrenia and similar disorders and used religious terms "to make things more vivid". "When I was writing it, I saw these terms and medical things that were just brilliant," he said. "Like there was a guy who felt that his skin was inside out. I read that and was like 'Oh my God! That's unbelievable; I've got to write about that.'" Petrucci wrote the music and lyrics to the acoustic "The Silent Man". LaBrie described the lyrics as dealing with "communication breakdown, for instance between a father and a son. We feel that we have to play certain roles when around one of our parents, and we never really get to know the real person. I'm lucky that I behave with my own father like I would a friend. We can joke around and go for a beer."

=== "The Mirror" ===
Portnoy wrote the lyrics to "The Mirror", describing his battle with alcoholism. He would return to the subject on later Dream Theater albums with the group's so-called "Twelve-step Suite."

Notably, although this is the first song released on a studio album with lyrics fully written by Portnoy, he had previously written part of the lyrics for Take the Time on Images and Words.

=== "Lie" ===
"Lie"
This excerpt is taken from forty-eight seconds onwards.

"Lie", the lead single from Awake, demonstrates the heavier, darker style of the album. The song is a live staple of the band. "Lie" was originally part of "The Mirror", but LaBrie thought it was strong enough to be a song in itself. "I remember one of the first tapes [the band] sent me to start jamming with up in Canada was 'The Mirror'," LaBrie said. "We used to jam instrumentally to it on the last tour and then we built it into a song, with the lyrics and melodies but also within the song was 'Lie'. I heard this groove and I was going 'Oh my God, that's a song in itself!' So I called up the guys and said 'Man, I really feel strong about this song. Can't we take that groove and build a song?'"

=== "Lifting Shadows Off a Dream" ===
"Lifting Shadows Off a Dream" began as a poem and two chords brought to the band by Myung. "We worked on it, racked our brains, recorded the jam and by the end of the night we were like 'Ahh fuck it. This sucks,'" Petrucci recalled. "We came by the next day, listened to the recording and thought it could be really cool. All of a sudden it evolved into this song."

=== "Scarred" ===
The lyrics to "Scarred" were initially inspired by a mishearing of the lyrics to The Clash's "Rock the Casbah". The song eventually took on a darker tone as the tempo changed and guitarist John Petrucci began writing lyrics about depression. The lines inspired by "Rock the Casbah", while present on the working demo, were removed entirely for the final release.

=== "Space-Dye Vest" ===
"Space-Dye Vest" was written by Moore, who brought the piece into the studio as a completed song.

== Artwork ==
Larry Freemantle, who had designed the cover of Images and Words, provided the artwork for Awake. As with Images and Words, the band instructed Freemantle to include several lyrical references in the cover, such as a clock showing the time 6:00, a mirror and a spider in the middle of a web. "The band were very definite about what they wanted, and where they wanted it," Freemantle said. "The mirror was to be buried in the sand with a factory in the background, so it was just a case of putting it together." Access Images, the company Freemantle had used for Images and Words, had broken up, meaning that he had to put the cover together using stock images himself. "It was done really quickly and I always felt frustrated with that sleeve as I lost too much time on it," Freemantle said. "I was always up against deadlines on certain things and it got away from me."

== Release and promotion ==
Awake was released on October 4, 1994, through East West Records. LaBrie considered the album's title to be "the perfect word to describe the album's lyrics. What we're basically talking about is the awareness of your existence - becoming closer and more in touch with yourself and ultimately discovering what works best for you as an individual as you try to get through life." Portnoy dedicated the album to his biggest inspiration, Frank Zappa, who died in 1993.

The album sold 36,160 copies the first week it was released. "Lie", the album's lead single, was released in late September. The accompanying music video featured the band, then a four-piece, playing the track at various locations in New York City, including the Brooklyn Bridge, Tribeca and a tunnel in Manhattan (which had to be temporarily closed in order to complete the shoot). It was hoped that "Lie" would be as successful as "Pull Me Under" had been, but the single failed to make an impact on the charts. "Caught in a Web" and "The Silent Man" were the album's second and third singles respectively. Portnoy was keen to direct the music video for "The Silent Man", but East West only offered him a co-directing credit with Pamela Birkhead. On the day of the shoot, Portnoy became violently ill, and when not needed to perform rested in his tour bus bunk.

== Touring ==
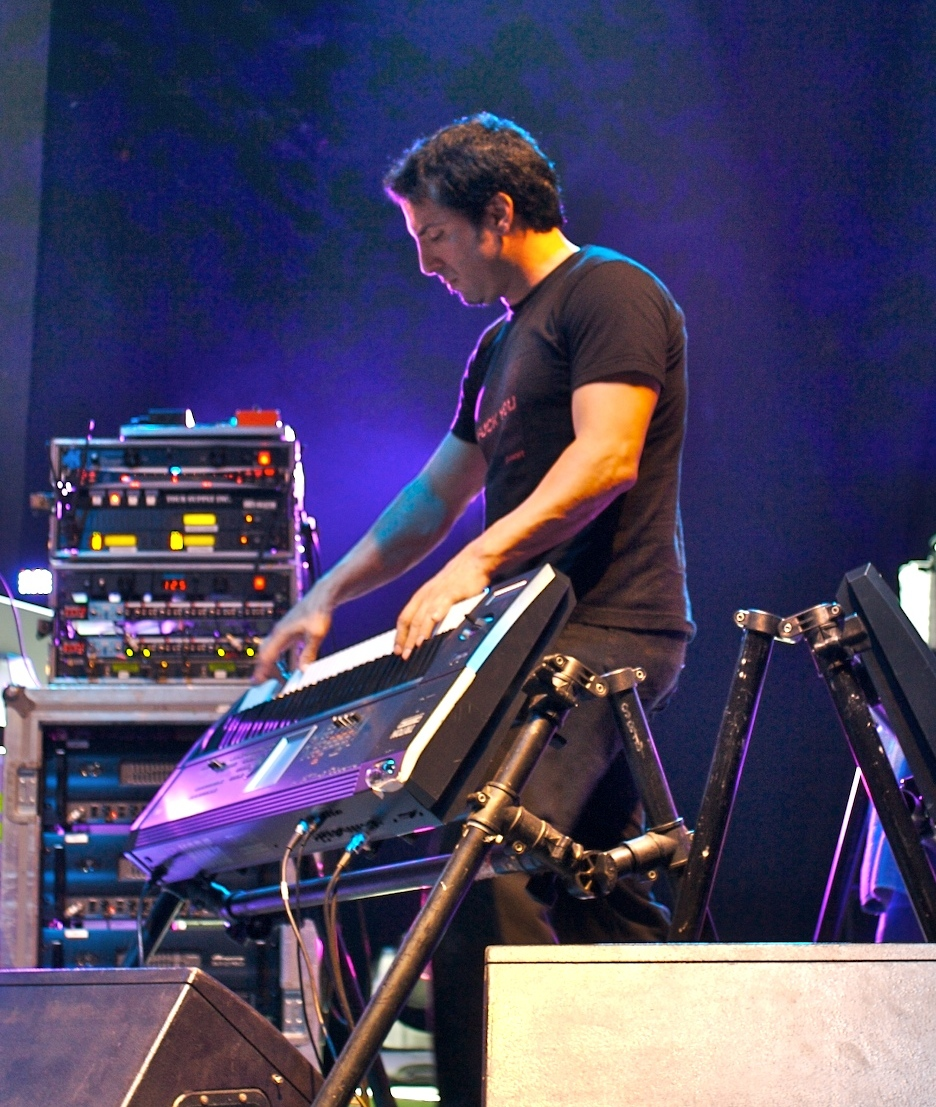
Derek Sherinian was hired to play keyboards on the Waking Up the World tour in October 1994, but was not made a full member of the band until February 1995.

With Moore no longer a member of Dream Theater, the band needed to find a replacement keyboardist for the forthcoming world tour in support of Awake. Before the tour started, the band had a headlining concert on September 9, 1994, at the Foundations Forum in Burbank, California. The album was to be unveiled in a live setting for the first time. Jordan Rudess's audition impressed the band, with Portnoy claiming that it had "blown his mind" and that Rudess was the "best keyboard player we'd ever seen". Rudess accepted the band's offer to perform with them at the Burbank show, but decided against joining the band for the entire tour. At the same time, he had received an offer to perform with the Dixie Dregs for shorter runs of shows and had a job with Kurzweil. Rudess also had a young family and was unsure if Dream Theater "was just going to be a flash in the pan". "I decided I would be better off going with the Dregs, continuing with Kurzweil, and being around for my family as much as possible," Rudess said. The show was not a success; the band were nervous of playing without Moore and were out of practice from not having played live for some time. Rudess eventually joined Dream Theater as a full band member in 1999.

The band held another round of auditions and were impressed with Derek Sherinian. Sherinian, who studied at Berklee College of Music the year before Petrucci, Portnoy, and Myung did, had previously played with Alice Cooper and Kiss and enjoyed similar music to the other members of Dream Theater. He was offered the position on a trial basis at the beginning of October 1994, giving him just two weeks to learn two hours of highly complex music. "It's one thing going in to play for an artist with hit songs that you've heard since you were a kid, and the songs are ingrained in your mind," Sherinian said. "It was another thing altogether going in with music you've never heard before that is totally off the charts as far as technical prowess... But it is amazing what one will do to ascend... when I was in New York at the rehearsals, I would play the songs at night over and over on a loop so that I would be subliminally programmed and it would ingrain it in my head." Sherinian was officially asked to join the band as a full member in February 1995.

The US leg of the Waking Up The World tour began on October 20, 1994, and finished on December 9. Over Christmas, LaBrie went on holiday to Cuba with his wife, where he had violent food poisoning. Upon his return home he consulted an ears, nose, and throat specialist, who told LaBrie that he had ruptured his vocal cords, advising him not to sing for six months to a year. "I was in total shock and devastated," LaBrie said. "On the US leg I had been so psyched and couldn't wait to blow everyone away around the rest of the world. We weren't in a position for me to take a six-month break so I had to keep touring." LaBrie was able to continue performing, but his voice became unpredictable. "It was absolutely miserable, and it was an extremely dark and depressing period for me," he recalled. "Literally every fucking night on the European leg, I wouldn't know if my voice would be there or if it would cooperate... I didn't feel that my voice really started to come back until maybe the Six Degrees of Inner Turbulence tour in 2002. That's when I started to feel my range and strength coming back."

The Great Hanshin earthquake struck Japan while Dream Theater were touring there. Although none of the band was injured, they seriously considered calling off the tour, but only ended up canceling one show. The band held a minute's silence at every show in Japan in memory of those who had died. During the soundchecks for the Japanese shows, the band rehearsed a series of cover songs. These were performed at a special covers-only show in Ronnie Scott's Jazz Club, London. The show, performed to an invitation-only audience of three hundred, featured guest musicians such as Barney Greenway, Steve Hogarth, Steve Rothery and Steve Howe. A selection of covers and medleys performed by Dream Theater at this show were released on A Change of Seasons.

== Reception ==
Professional ratings
Review scores
Source	Rating
AllMusic	4/5 stars
Collector's Guide to Heavy Metal	6/10
Guitar World	Favorable
Q	Favorable
Rock Hard	10/10

Awake peaked at 32 on the Billboard 200, remaining in the charts for six weeks. This would remain the band's highest-charting release in the US until Systematic Chaos in 2007, which was eventually topped by 2009's Black Clouds & Silver Linings, which peaked at No. 6. The album peaked in the top 20 in four countries. Derek Oliver, Dream Theater's label representative considered the album to be a commercial failure. This led to the band once again working with David Prater on A Change of Seasons and to the record label putting increasing pressure on the band to make songs on their next studio album, Falling into Infinity, more commercial and radio-friendly.

In spite of the plentiful redeeming features on Awake, press reviews were generally subdued. It must of course be remembered that it was released just as the shoegazing, miserable purveyors of the fad known as grunge were taking hold. The British press in particular seemed dazzled by the work of Kurt Cobain and his cohorts, and anything that wasn't based around three chords or packed with lyrics championing depression as a lifestyle choice was in for a hard ride.

— Rich Wilson, Lifting Shadows

Awake received acclaim from music critics. Q wrote that "fans of Marillion may well love this, and even the sceptical listener can enjoy the crunching, radio-friendly choruses of "Scarred" and "Caught in a Web"." Guitar World ranked the album as one of the top ten releases of the year, stating that "this shred party left me punch drunk and, for once in my life, fully Awake." Metal Hammer dismissed Awake as "musical masturbation": "Progressive rock is basically a very adolescent notion of what 'grown up' music might sound like - more notes, longer solos and, best/worst of all, convoluted concepts... Their propensity for pomposity extends to the ballad "Silent Man", which would probably like to be Queensrÿche's "Silent Lucidity" but in fact sounds like Stryper on a particularly pious day". The album has since sold nearly 400,000 copies.

Later reviews were more favorable. Reviewers praised the album's production, noting the album is darker and heavier than previous Dream Theater releases. The musicianship of the band has been praised. Phil Carter of AllMusic highlighted Petrucci and Portnoy's performances; Metal Storm praised LaBrie and Portnoy; Murat Batmaz of Sea of Tranquility praised all the performances, but singled out Moore's contribution as "immense" and complimented him on "a lucid layer of atmosphere around [the album] built by none other than Kevin Moore." Carter ranked "Lie", "Scarred", "Caught in a Web" and "Space-Dye Vest" as the best tracks. Metal Storm praised "6:00" and the "A Mind Beside Itself" suite.

In a 1995 Guitar World interview, Chuck Schuldiner praised Awake and the band Dream Theater in general, claiming that "their music is very complex, but they definitely have hooks, which is crucial to making music listenable", citing them as an influence on the more progressive nature of his band Death's later material as opposed to the stagnant death metal scene at the time. In 2005, Awake was ranked number 390 in Rock Hard magazine's book of The 500 Greatest Rock & Metal Albums of All Time. In July 2014, the album was ranked number 1 in Guitar World magazine's list of "Superunknown: 50 Iconic Albums That Defined 1994".

== Track listing ==
All music is composed by Dream Theater, except where noted.

No.	Title	Lyrics	Length
1.	"6:00"	Kevin Moore	5:31
2.	"Caught in a Web"	James LaBrie, John Petrucci	5:28
3.	"Innocence Faded"	Petrucci	5:42
4.	"Erotomania"	(instrumental)	6:44
5.	"Voices"	Petrucci	9:53
6.	"The Silent Man" (music: Petrucci)	Petrucci	3:47
7.	"The Mirror"	Mike Portnoy	6:45
8.	"Lie"	Moore	6:33
9.	"Lifting Shadows Off a Dream"	John Myung	6:05
10.	"Scarred"	Petrucci	10:59
11.	"Space-Dye Vest" (music: Moore)	Moore	7:29
Total length:			74:56

Japanese 3" bonus disc
No.	Title	Lyrics	Length
1.	"Eve"	(instrumental)	5:05

== Personnel ==
Dream Theater

- James LaBrie – lead vocals
- Kevin Moore – keyboards
- John Myung – bass
- John Petrucci – guitars
- Mike Portnoy – drums, percussion

Production

- John Purdell, Duane Baron – engineering, mixing, producers
- Mike Stock, Greg Cathcart – engineering assistance
- Ed Miller – mixing assistance
- Ted Jensen – mastering
- Rich Kern – programming ("Space-Dye Vest")
- Prix-mo – dialogue ("Voices")
- Larry Freemantle, Donald May – art direction
- Dennis Keeley – photography
- Dream Theater, Dan Muro – cover concept

== Charts ==
Chart (1994)	Peak position
Dutch Albums (Album Top 100)	33
German Albums (Offizielle Top 100)	15
Japanese Albums (Oricon)	7
Swedish Albums (Sverigetopplistan)	5
Swiss Albums (Schweizer Hitparade)	12
UK Albums (OCC)	65
UK Rock & Metal Albums (OCC)	4
US Billboard 200	32

== Certifications ==
Region	Certification	Certified units/sales
Japan (RIAJ)	Gold	100,000^{^}
^{^} Shipments figures based on certification alone.
