= A Change of Seasons =

1995 EP by Dream Theater

EP by Dream Theater
- Released: September 19, 1995
- Recorded: January 31, 1995 (live tracks); May 1995
- Venue: Ronnie Scott's Jazz Club (London)
- Studios: BearTracks Studios (Suffern, New York)
- Genres: Progressive metal; progressive rock
- Length: 57:30
- Label: EastWest
- Producers: David Prater, Dream Theater

Dream Theater chronology
Awake (1994)	A Change of Seasons (1995)	Falling into Infinity (1997)

Professional ratings
Review scores
Source	Rating
AllMusic	4.5/5 stars
Collector's Guide to Heavy Metal	6/10

A Change of Seasons is the first EP by American progressive metal band Dream Theater, first released on September 19, 1995, through East West Records. It comprises the 23-minute title track and a collection of live cover songs performed at a fan club concert on January 31, 1995, at Ronnie Scott's Jazz Club in London.

The title track was recorded at BearTracks Studios in New York and was originally slated to be released on the 1992 album Images and Words, but was instead re-recorded and released as an EP. Although the song includes audio samples from the 1989 film Dead Poets Society (as well as quotes from the 1648 Robert Herrick poem, To the Virgins, to Make Much of Time), the lyrics, written by drummer Mike Portnoy, were not inspired by the film. Instead, "it's about the cycle of life. Basically, I took a lot of personal incidents, like losing my mother and a couple of things that happened in my life, and I wrote them into the lyrics." The back cover has a calendar displaying the date November 16, the date Portnoy's mother died. A Change of Seasons was also the first Dream Theater release featuring Derek Sherinian on keyboards.

Excerpts from the title track were used by NBC in a segment on downhill skiing during the 2002 Winter Olympics.

Although the record is labeled as an EP, its running time of 57:30 makes it significantly longer than a standard EP, and even many LPs, including Dream Theater's first two albums. According to Portnoy, "It was important for us and the label for it not to be perceived as the latest studio record. That's why we tagged it an EP."

== Track listing ==
No.	Title	Lyrics	Music	Length
1.	"A Change of Seasons": "I. The Crimson Sunrise" (instrumental); "II. Innocence"; "III. Carpe Diem"; "IV. The Darkest of Winters" (instrumental); "V. Another World"; "VI. The Inevitable Summer" (instrumental); "VII. The Crimson Sunset"	Mike Portnoy	Dream Theater	23:09
2.	"Funeral for a Friend/Love Lies Bleeding" (Elton John cover)	Bernie Taupin	Elton John	10:46
3.	"Perfect Strangers" (Deep Purple cover)	Ian Gillan	Ritchie Blackmore, Roger Glover	5:33
4.	"The Rover" / "Achilles Last Stand" / "The Song Remains the Same" (Led Zeppelin cover)	Robert Plant	Jimmy Page	7:30
5.	"The Big Medley": "In the Flesh?" (Pink Floyd cover); "Carry On Wayward Son" (Kansas cover); "Bohemian Rhapsody" (Queen cover); "Lovin', Touchin', Squeezin'" (Journey cover); "Cruise Control" (Dixie Dregs cover); "Turn It On Again" (Genesis cover)"	Roger Waters; Kerry Livgren; Freddie Mercury; Steve Perry; (instrumental); Mike Rutherford	Waters; Livgren; Mercury; Perry; Steve Morse; Tony Banks, Phil Collins, Rutherford	10:32: 2:25; 2:10; 1:25; 2:07; 1:03; 1:23
Total length:				57:30

== Personnel ==
Dream Theater

- James LaBrie – lead vocals
- John Myung – bass
- John Petrucci – guitars
- Mike Portnoy – drums, percussion
- Derek Sherinian – keyboards

Production

- David Prater – production, mixing
- Dream Theater – production
- Doug Oberkircher – engineer (track 1), mixing
- Andy Scarth – engineer (tracks 2–5)
- Robert Siciliano – assistant engineer
- Ted Jensen – mastering at Sterling Sound, NYC
- Larry Freemantle – art direction
- Joseph Cultice – photography
- Mike Portnoy – cover concept

== Chart performance ==
Chart (1995)	Peak position
Dutch Albums (Album Top 100)	39
Finnish Albums (Suomen virallinen lista)	17
German Albums (Offizielle Top 100)	50
Swedish Albums (Sverigetopplistan)	13
US Billboard 200	58
UK Albums (Official Charts)	88
