= Score (Dream Theater album) =

2006 live album by Dream Theater

Live album by Dream Theater
- Released: August 29, 2006
- Recorded: April 1, 2006
- Venue: Radio City Music Hall (New York City, New York)
- Genre: Symphonic metal; progressive metal; progressive rock
- Length: 157:08
- Label: Rhino Entertainment
- Producer: Ethan Mesmer

Dream Theater chronology
Octavarium (2005)	Score (2006)	Systematic Chaos (2007)

Professional ratings
Review scores
Source	Rating
AllMusic	3.5/5 stars
Rock Reviews	8/10 stars

Score

Video by Dream Theater
- Released: August 29, 2006
- Recorded: April 1, 2006
- Venue: Radio City Music Hall (New York City, New York)
- Genre: Symphonic metal; progressive metal; progressive rock
- Length: 164:20 (Disc 1); 87:42 (Disc 2)
- Label: Rhino Entertainment
- Director: Mike Portnoy

Dream Theater chronology
Live at Budokan (2004)	Score (2006)	Chaos in Motion 2007–2008 (2008)

Professional ratings
Review scores
Source	Rating
About.com	4/5 stars
Metal Review	10/10 stars
PopMatters	8/10 stars

Score is the fifth live album by American progressive metal band Dream Theater. It was recorded on April 1, 2006, at Radio City Music Hall in New York City. The concert was the last of their 20th Anniversary Tour, labeled "A Very Special Evening with Dream Theater". The entire second half of the concert features a complete symphonic orchestra, dubbed "The Octavarium Orchestra", conducted by Jamshied Sharifi.

The album was released on August 29, 2006, and contains the entire concert setlist, including the encore. A condensed version of the concert was aired on VH1 Classic on August 25, 2006, 4 days before the release of the album and DVD. It was released on September 2, 2006, in Australia.

The title of the album comes from the word "score", meaning the number twenty, in reference to the band's 20th anniversary. It can also refer to a conductor's musical score, which is seen on the album cover.

Two of the songs recorded on this album were previously unreleased: "Another Won," a song written by the band in their earlier years, when they were known as Majesty; and "Raise the Knife", a song recorded for but omitted from Falling into Infinity.

In Australia, the three-disc version of the album was released on September 2, 2006.

== Track listing ==
=== CD ===
All music composed by Dream Theater.

Disc one
No.	Title	Lyrics	Performer(s)	Length
1.	"The Root of All Evil"	Portnoy	Dream Theater	8:22
2.	"I Walk Beside You"	John Petrucci	Dream Theater	4:11
3.	"Another Won"	Petrucci	Dream Theater	5:22
4.	"Afterlife"	Charlie Dominici	Dream Theater	5:56
5.	"Under a Glass Moon"	Petrucci	Dream Theater	7:29
6.	"Innocence Faded"	Petrucci	Dream Theater	5:36
7.	"Raise the Knife"	Portnoy	Dream Theater	11:43
8.	"The Spirit Carries On"	Petrucci	Dream Theater	9:46
Total length:				58:25

Disc two
No.	Title	Lyrics	...	Length
1.	"Six Degrees of Inner Turbulence" (music: Petrucci, John Myung, Jordan Rudess, Portnoy)	Petrucci, Portnoy	Dream Theater & The Octavarium Orchestra	41:33
2.	"Vacant" (music: Myung, Rudess)	James LaBrie	Dream Theater & The Octavarium Orchestra	3:01
3.	"The Answer Lies Within"	Petrucci	Dream Theater & The Octavarium Orchestra	5:36
4.	"Sacrificed Sons"	LaBrie	Dream Theater & The Octavarium Orchestra	10:38
Total length:				1:00:48

Disc three
No.	Title	Lyrics	...	Length
1.	"Octavarium"	LaBrie, Petrucci, Portnoy	Dream Theater & the Octavarium Orchestra	27:16
2.	"Metropolis—Part I: "The Miracle and the Sleeper""	Petrucci	Dream Theater & the Octavarium Orchestra	10:39
Total length:				37:55

=== DVD ===
Tracks 1 through 8 feature Dream Theater alone. Tracks 9 through 14 feature Dream Theater and The Octavarium Orchestra.

==== Disc one ====
1. "The Root of All Evil" (from Octavarium) – 9:32
2. "I Walk Beside You" (from Octavarium) – 4:10
3. "Another Won" (from The Majesty Demos) – 5:40
4. "Afterlife" (from When Dream and Day Unite) – 7:28
5. "Under a Glass Moon" (from Images and Words) – 7:27
6. "Innocence Faded" (from Awake) – 6:16
7. "Raise the Knife" (unreleased track from the Falling into Infinity sessions) – 11:51
8. "The Spirit Carries On" (from Metropolis Pt. 2: Scenes from a Memory) – 9:37
9. "Six Degrees of Inner Turbulence" (from Six Degrees of Inner Turbulence) – 41:26
10. "Vacant" (from Train of Thought) – 3:03
11. "The Answer Lies Within" (from Octavarium) – 5:36
12. "Sacrificed Sons" (from Octavarium) – 10:36
13. "Octavarium" (from Octavarium) – 27:29
14. "Metropolis" (from Images and Words) – 11:16
15. Credits – 2:53

==== Disc two ====
- "The Score So Far..." 20th Anniversary Documentary – 56:25
- Octavarium Animation – 3:06
- "Another Day" (Live in Tokyo – August 26, 1993) (from Images and Words) – 4:47
- "The Great Debate" (Live in Bucharest – July 4, 2002) (from Six Degrees of Inner Turbulence) – 13:37
- "Honor Thy Father" (Live in Chicago – August 12, 2005) (from Train of Thought) – 9:47

== Personnel ==
- James LaBrie – Lead Vocals
- John Myung – Bass
- John Petrucci – Guitar, backing vocals
- Mike Portnoy – Drums, backing vocals
- Jordan Rudess – Keyboards, Continuum, and Lap steel guitar

=== Octavarium Orchestra ===
Conductor

- Jamshied Sharifi

Violins

- Elena Barere - (Concertmistress)
- Yuri Vodovos
- Belinda Whitney
- Avril Brown
- Katherine Livolsi
- Abe Appleman
- Joyce Hammann
- Karen Karlsrud
- Ann Leathers
- Ricky Sortomme
- Jan Mullen
- Carol Pool

Violas

- Vincent Lionti
- Adria Benjamin
- Judy Witmer
- Crystal Garner
- Jonathan Dinklage

Cellos

- Richard Locker
- Eugene Moye
- David Heiss
- Caryl Paisner

French horn

- Bob Carlisle
- Dan Culpepper
- Larry DiBello

Bass Trombone

- George Flynn

Flute / Piccolo

- Pamela Sklar

B Flat Clarinet

- Ole Mathisen

Trumpet

- Jeff Kievit
- Jim Hynes

Percussion

- Gordon Gottlieb

== Charts ==
Chart (2006)	Peak position
Belgian Albums (Ultratop Wallonia)	89
Dutch Albums (Album Top 100)	34
Finnish Albums (Suomen virallinen lista)	36
German Albums (Offizielle Top 100)	40
Hungarian Albums (MAHASZ)	31
Italian Albums (FIMI)	14
Norwegian Albums (VG-lista)	18
Spanish Albums (Promusicae)	72
Swiss Albums (Schweizer Hitparade)	81
US Billboard 200	134

== Certifications ==
Region	Certification	Certified units/sales
Australia (ARIA)	Gold	7,500^{^}
United States (RIAA)	Platinum	100,000^{^}
^{^} Shipments figures based on certification alone.
