= Greatest Hit (...And 21 Other Pretty Cool Songs) =

2008 compilation album by Dream Theater

Greatest hits album by Dream Theater
- Released: March 29, 2008
- Recorded: October 14, 1991 – February 25, 2005 at various studios
- Genres: Progressive metal; Progressive rock
- Length: 138:16
- Label: Rhino
- Producers: John Petrucci; Mike Portnoy; David Prater; Duane Baron; John Purdell; Kevin Shirley

Dream Theater chronology
Systematic Chaos (2007)	Greatest Hit (...And 21 Other Pretty Cool Songs) (2008)	Chaos in Motion 2007–2008 (2008)

Professional ratings
Review scores
Source	Rating
AllMusic	2.5/5 stars
Sputnikmusic	3.0/5

Greatest Hit (...And 21 Other Pretty Cool Songs) is a compilation album by American progressive metal band Dream Theater, released in Australia on March 29, 2008, and by Rhino Records in the United States on April 1. The title alludes to their only top-10 radio hit, "Pull Me Under". It features three songs from their breakthrough album, Images and Words, remixed by Kevin Shirley: "Pull Me Under", "Take the Time", and "Another Day". The compilation also includes "To Live Forever", a re-recording from the Awake era of a song originally from the Images and Words sessions (previously featured as a B-side of the single "Lie"), which had not been released on a full-length album. Several single edits of popular Dream Theater songs are also included.

The tracks are divided into two discs: the first, titled "The Dark Side", features heavy, metal-influenced songs, while the second, "The Light Side", highlights the band's melodic side. The collection spans the years 1991 to 2005 and, as a result, does not include any songs from Dream Theater's debut album, When Dream and Day Unite, their A Change of Seasons EP (despite its 1995 release), or their 2007 album, Systematic Chaos.

Drummer Mike Portnoy explained in the album's booklet that the song selection was carefully curated to appeal to both new listeners and longtime fans. The compilation offers alternative versions of songs from previous albums to entice newcomers to explore the band's catalog while providing existing fans with fresh takes on familiar tracks. He also remarked that a third disc, titled "The Epic Side", should have been included.

== Track listing ==
=== Disc one ("The Dark Side") ===
No.	Title	Lyrics	Music	Original album	Length
1.	"Pull Me Under" (2007 remix)	Kevin Moore	Dream Theater	Images and Words, 1992	8:13
2.	"Take the Time" (2007 remix)	Dream Theater	Dream Theater	Images and Words	8:22
3.	"Lie" (Single edit)	Moore	Dream Theater	Awake, 1994	5:02
4.	"Peruvian Skies"	John Petrucci	Dream Theater	Falling into Infinity, 1997	6:42
5.	"Home" (Single edit)	Mike Portnoy	Dream Theater	Metropolis Pt. 2: Scenes from a Memory, 1999	5:38
6.	"Misunderstood" (Single edit)	Petrucci	Petrucci, John Myung, Jordan Rudess, Portnoy	Six Degrees of Inner Turbulence, 2002	5:14
7.	"The Test That Stumped Them All" (Single edit)	Portnoy	Petrucci, Myung, Rudess, Portnoy	Six Degrees of Inner Turbulence	5:00
8.	"As I Am" (Clean single edit)	Petrucci	Petrucci, Myung, Rudess, Portnoy	Train of Thought, 2003	7:14
9.	"Endless Sacrifice"	Petrucci	Petrucci, Myung, Rudess, Portnoy	Train of Thought	11:23
10.	"The Root of All Evil" (Edited version)	Portnoy	Dream Theater	Octavarium, 2005	7:16
11.	"Sacrificed Sons" (Edited version)	James LaBrie	Dream Theater	Octavarium	9:41

=== Disc two ("The Light Side") ===
No.	Title	Lyrics	Music	Original album	Length
1.	"Another Day" (2007 remix)	Petrucci	Dream Theater	Images and Words	4:25
2.	"To Live Forever"	Petrucci, Moore	Dream Theater	B-side to the "Lie" single, 1994	4:56
3.	"Lifting Shadows off a Dream"	Myung	Dream Theater	Awake	6:09
4.	"The Silent Man"	Petrucci	Petrucci	Awake	3:47
5.	"Hollow Years"	Petrucci	Dream Theater	Falling into Infinity	5:55
6.	"Through Her Eyes" (Alternate album mix)	Petrucci	Dream Theater	Metropolis Pt. 2: Scenes from a Memory	6:03
7.	"The Spirit Carries On"	Petrucci	Dream Theater	Metropolis Pt. 2: Scenes from a Memory	6:40
8.	"Solitary Shell" (Single edit)	Petrucci	Petrucci, Myung, Rudess, Portnoy	Six Degrees of Inner Turbulence	4:10
9.	"I Walk Beside You"	Petrucci	Dream Theater	Octavarium	4:28
10.	"The Answer Lies Within" (Edited version)	Petrucci	Dream Theater	Octavarium	5:15
11.	"Disappear"	LaBrie	Petrucci, Myung, Rudess, Portnoy	Six Degrees of Inner Turbulence	6:45

== Personnel ==
- James LaBrie – lead vocals
- John Petrucci – guitar, backing vocals
- John Myung – bass
- Mike Portnoy – drums, backing vocals
- Jordan Rudess – keyboards (tracks 5–11 on disc one and tracks 6–11 on disc two)
- Kevin Moore – keyboards (tracks 1–3 on disc one and tracks 1–4 on disc two)
- Derek Sherinian – keyboards, backing vocals on "Peruvian Skies" and "Hollow Years"
- Jay Beckenstein – saxophone on "Another Day" and "Through Her Eyes"
- Theresa Thomason – additional vocals on "Through Her Eyes" and "The Spirit Carries On"

== Song notes ==
- The versions of "As I Am" and the four songs originally released on Octavarium differ slightly from the original recordings, although this is not indicated in the album credits. "As I Am" omits the opening orchestral chord and removes the use of profanity, while the songs from Octavarium exclude the sound effects that originally served as interludes between tracks. For example, the opening F note played on the keyboard and the one-minute intro to "The Root of All Evil" are removed, with the song beginning precisely at 1:00.
- On the album cover, the "s" in "Greatest" and "hit" in "Hit" are subtly printed in red, forming the word "shit" as a commentary on the band's well-documented frustration with the status of "Pull Me Under". The album artwork extends this theme, featuring a seagull dropping stain on an armchair emblazoned with the Dream Theater logo.

== Chart positions ==
Chart (2008)	Peak position
Belgian Albums (Ultratop Flanders)	74
Dutch Albums (Album Top 100)	52
German Albums (Offizielle Top 100)	77
Hungarian Albums (MAHASZ)	38
Italian Albums (FIMI)	37
Japanese Albums (Oricon)	28
Norwegian Albums (VG-lista)	12
Swedish Albums (Sverigetopplistan)	46
Swiss Albums (Schweizer Hitparade)	62
UK Albums (OCC)	113
US Billboard 200	122
