= Live at Luna Park =

2013 live album by Dream Theater

Live album by Dream Theater
- Released: November 5, 2013
- Recorded: August 19–20, 2012
- Venues: Luna Park Stadium, Buenos Aires, Argentina
- Genres: Progressive metal; progressive rock
- Length: 195:13 (video); 189:09 (album)
- Label: Eagle Rock Entertainment
- Producer: John Petrucci

Dream Theater chronology
Dream Theater (2013)	Live at Luna Park (2013)	Breaking the Fourth Wall (2014)

Professional ratings
Review scores
Source	Rating
AllMusic	4/5 stars
Dangerdog	5/5 stars
About.com	4.5/5 stars

Live at Luna Park is the seventh live album and video by American progressive metal band Dream Theater, released on November 5, 2013, through Eagle Rock Entertainment. The concert film was produced by Over The Edge Productions and directed by Mike Leonard. The album is available as a two-disc DVD, single-disc Blu-ray, 2DVD/3CD, Blu-ray/3CD, and a deluxe edition box set including all three formats with a 40-page book. Both the album and video are also available as digital downloads.

The album was recorded over two nights at Luna Park Stadium in Buenos Aires, the complete show of disc 1 on August 19, 2012, and the bonus tracks of disc 2 on August 20, 2012. It is Dream Theater's first live recording to feature drummer Mike Mangini, following Mike Portnoy's departure in 2010.

== Track listing ==
The band toured for about 15 months, performing in 35 countries, supporting their commercially successful studio album, A Dramatic Turn of Events, released in 2011. The track list is primarily based on the songs from this album.

DVD disc 1
No.	Title	Original Album & Year	Length
1.	"Introduction / Bridges in the Sky"	A Dramatic Turn of Events (2011)	10:59
2.	"6:00"	Awake (1994)	7:09
3.	"The Dark Eternal Night"	Systematic Chaos (2007)	10:01
4.	"This Is the Life"	A Dramatic Turn of Events (2011)	7:00
5.	"The Root of All Evil"	Octavarium (2005)	9:29
6.	"Lost Not Forgotten"	A Dramatic Turn of Events (2011)	10:09
7.	"Drum Solo"		6:28
8.	"A Fortune in Lies"	When Dream and Day Unite (1989)	6:40
9.	"The Silent Man" (acoustic)	Awake (1994)	4:05
10.	"Beneath the Surface"	A Dramatic Turn of Events (2011)	5:43
11.	"Outcry"	A Dramatic Turn of Events (2011)	11:29
12.	"Piano Solo"		3:02
13.	"Surrounded"	Images and Words (1992)	6:03
14.	"On the Backs of Angels"	A Dramatic Turn of Events (2011)	8:35
15.	"War Inside My Head"	Six Degrees of Inner Turbulence (2002)	2:25
16.	"The Test That Stumped Them All"	Six Degrees of Inner Turbulence (2002)	5:02
17.	"Guitar Solo"		9:55
18.	"The Spirit Carries On"	Metropolis Pt. 2: Scenes from a Memory (1999)	7:20
19.	"Breaking All Illusions"	A Dramatic Turn of Events (2011)	13:43
20.	"Metropolis—Part I: "The Miracle and the Sleeper""	Images and Words (1992)	12:33
21.	"End Credits"		2:14

DVD disc 2: bonus tracks
No.	Title	Original Album & Year	Length
1.	"These Walls"	Octavarium (2005)	7:07
2.	"Build Me Up, Break Me Down"	A Dramatic Turn of Events (2011)	6:55
3.	"Caught in a Web"	Awake (1994)	5:40
4.	"Wait for Sleep" (acoustic)	Images and Words (1992)	2:51
5.	"Far from Heaven" (acoustic)	A Dramatic Turn of Events (2011)	3:55
6.	"Pull Me Under"	Images and Words (1992)	8:30

DVD disc 2: documentary
No.	Title	Length
1.	"Intro / Recap"	7:38
2.	"Dinner in Buenos Aires"	3:01
3.	"Soundcheck"	4:50
4.	"Pre-Show Rituals"	4:03
5.	"The Show Goes On"	6:19

DVD disc 2: bonus features
No.	Title	Length
1.	"Trailer"	2:26
2.	"Behind the Scenes"	4:21
3.	"Cartoon Intro"	3:12

=== Special edition CD ===
The Special Edition 6-disc set includes the 2 DVDs and the Blu-ray as specified above as well as the audio tracks on a 3-disc set.

Disc 1
No.	Title	Lyrics	Music	Original album	Length
1.	"Bridges in the Sky"	Petrucci	Petrucci, Myung, Rudess	A Dramatic Turn of Events	11:00
2.	"6:00"	Moore	Dream Theater	Awake	5:55
3.	"The Dark Eternal Night"	Petrucci	Dream Theater	Systematic Chaos	10:10
4.	"This Is the Life"	Petrucci	Petrucci, Rudess	A Dramatic Turn of Events	7:02
5.	"The Root of All Evil"	Portnoy	Dream Theater	Octavarium	9:30
6.	"Lost Not Forgotten"	Petrucci	Petrucci, Myung, Rudess, LaBrie	A Dramatic Turn of Events	9:58
7.	"Drum Solo"	(instrumental)	Mangini		6:19
8.	"A Fortune in Lies"	Petrucci	Dream Theater	When Dream and Day Unite	5:20
9.	"The Silent Man"	Petrucci	Petrucci	Awake	4:16
10.	"Beneath the Surface"	Petrucci	Petrucci	A Dramatic Turn of Events	5:29
Total length:					74:55

Disc 2
No.	Title	Lyrics	Music	Original album	Length
1.	"Outcry"	Petrucci	Petrucci, Myung, Rudess	A Dramatic Turn of Events	11:31
2.	"Piano Solo"	(instrumental)	Rudess		3:05
3.	"Surrounded"	Moore	Dream Theater	Images and Words	6:05
4.	"On the Backs of Angels"	Petrucci	Petrucci, Myung, Rudess	A Dramatic Turn of Events	8:32
5.	"War Inside My Head"	Portnoy	Petrucci, Portnoy, Myung, Rudess	Six Degrees of Inner Turbulence	2:15
6.	"The Test That Stumped Them All"	Portnoy	Petrucci, Portnoy, Myung, Rudess	Six Degrees of Inner Turbulence	4:55
7.	"Guitar Solo"	(instrumental)	Petrucci		8:39
8.	"The Spirit Carries On"	Petrucci	Dream Theater	Metropolis Pt. 2: Scenes from a Memory	7:54
9.	"Breaking All Illusions"	Myung, Petrucci	Petrucci, Myung, Rudess	A Dramatic Turn of Events	12:44
10.	"Metropolis Pt. 1: The Miracle and the Sleeper"	Petrucci	Dream Theater	Images and Words	12:46
Total length:					78:22

Disc 3
No.	Title	Lyrics	Music	Original album	Length
1.	"These Walls"	Petrucci	Dream Theater	Octavarium	7:28
2.	"Build Me Up, Break Me Down"	Petrucci	Petrucci, Myung, Rudess, LaBrie	A Dramatic Turn of Events	7:04
3.	"Caught in a Web"	Petrucci, LaBrie	Dream Theater	Awake	5:42
4.	"Wait for Sleep"	Moore	Moore	Images and Words	2:52
5.	"Far from Heaven"	LaBrie	Petrucci, Rudess, LaBrie	A Dramatic Turn of Events	4:07
6.	"Pull Me Under"	Moore	Dream Theater	Images and Words	8:31
Total length:					35:41

== Personnel ==
- James LaBrie – lead vocals
- John Petrucci – guitars, backing vocals
- Jordan Rudess – keyboards, keytar, continuum, lap steel guitar, iPad app Morphwiz
- John Myung – bass, Moog Taurus pedals
- Mike Mangini – drums

=== String quartet ===
- Oleg Pishenin – 1st violin
- Serdar Geldymuradov – 2nd violin
- Joëlle Perdaens – viola
- Néstor Tedesco – violincello

=== Other ===
- Hugh Syme - cover art

== Charts ==
=== Albums charts ===
Chart (2013)	Peak position
Dutch Albums (Album Top 100)	52

=== Video charts ===
Chart (2013)	Peak position
Dutch DVDs (Music DVD Top 30)	11
Finnish DVDs (Suomen virallinen lista)	1
German Albums (Offizielle Top 100)	17
Japanese blu-ray (Oricon)	17
Japanese DVDs (Oricon)	74
Swiss DVDS (Schweizer Hitparade)	2
