= Live at Budokan (Dream Theater album) =

2004 live album by Dream Theater

Live album by Dream Theater
- Released: October 5, 2004
- Recorded: April 26, 2004
- Venues: Nippon Budokan, Tokyo
- Genres: Progressive metal; progressive rock
- Length: 169:29
- Label: Atlantic
- Producers: John Petrucci & Mike Portnoy

Dream Theater chronology
Train of Thought (2003)	Live at Budokan (2004)	Octavarium (2005)

Live at Budokan

Video by Dream Theater
- Released: October 5, 2004
- Recorded: April 26, 2004
- Venues: Nippon Budokan Hall, Tokyo
- Genres: Progressive metal; progressive rock
- Length: 172:34 (Disc 1); 72:50 (Disc 2)
- Label: Atlantic

Dream Theater chronology
Metropolis 2000: Scenes from New York (2001)	Live at Budokan (2004)	Score (2006)

Live at Budokan is the fourth live album by American progressive metal band Dream Theater, released on October 5, 2004, available on either 3 CDs, 2 DVDs, or 1 Blu-ray Disc. It was recorded at the Nippon Budokan Hall in Tokyo, Japan on April 26, 2004.

Due to time constraints, the songs "The Great Debate", "Under a Glass Moon" and "Caught in a Web", which was set to include an extended drum solo, were removed from the setlist at the last minute, although it can be seen recorded in Osaka as part of the extra features of the DVD and Blu-ray versions. Additionally, during the credits, an instrumental version of the song "Vacant" is played in the background.

According to the Commentary Track on their "When Dream And Day Reunite" Official Bootleg Live DVD, Jordan Rudess had an equipment malfunction during the first few minutes of the live concert that played either the incorrect sound, no sound at all, or random notes a half step upward in pitch. Nevertheless, Rudess mimed playing the correct parts as he realized they would have to be re-recorded during post-production. This technical error may be the reason for the additional 8-minute improvised jam section during the evening's performance of "Beyond this Life". Rudess played his Kurzweil K2600 as a master keyboard in live shows up to this point, but he began using a Korg OASYS for subsequent Dream Theater album cycles from Octavarium until Black Clouds & Silver Linings. Ironically, he would encounter the same problem with a Roland keyboard during a Liquid Tension Experiment concert at Park West in Chicago in 2008, as documented on When the Keyboard Breaks: Live in Chicago.

The live DVD was re-released on Blu-ray, on October 18, 2011.

== Track listing ==
All music by John Petrucci, John Myung, Jordan Rudess, Mike Portnoy except where noted.

CD

Disc one

No.	Title	Lyrics	Music	Original album (year)	Length
1.	"As I Am"	John Petrucci		Train of Thought (2003)	7:25
2.	"This Dying Soul"	Mike Portnoy		Train of Thought (2003)	11:44
3.	"Beyond This Life"	Petrucci	Dream Theater	Metropolis Pt. 2: Scenes from a Memory (1999)	19:37
4.	"Hollow Years"	Petrucci	Dream Theater	Falling into Infinity (1997)	9:18
5.	"War Inside My Head"	Portnoy		Six Degrees of Inner Turbulence (2002)	2:22
6.	"The Test That Stumped Them All"	Portnoy		Six Degrees of Inner Turbulence (2002)	5:00

Disc two

No.	Title	Lyrics	Music	Original album (year)	Length
1.	"Endless Sacrifice"	Petrucci		Train of Thought (2003)	11:18
2.	"Instrumedley": " I. Scene Seven: I. The Dance of Eternity"; " II. Metropolis Pt. 1: The Miracle and the Sleeper"; " III. A Mind Beside Itself: I. Erotomania"; " IV. Scene Seven: I. The Dance of Eternity"; " V. Metropolis Pt. 1: The Miracle and the Sleeper"; " VI. The Darkest of Winters"; " VII. When the Water Breaks" (Liquid Tension Experiment); " VIII. The Darkest of Winters"; " IX. Ytse Jam"; " X. Scene Seven: I. The Dance of Eternity"; " XI. Paradigm Shift" (Liquid Tension Experiment); " XII. Universal Mind" (Liquid Tension Experiment); " XIII. Scene Seven: I. The Dance of Eternity"; " XIV. Hell's Kitchen"	(instrumental)	Dream Theater	(original): Metropolis Pt. 2: Scenes from a Memory (1999); Images and Words (1992); Awake (1994); Metropolis Pt. 2: Scenes from a Memory (1999); Images and Words (1992); A Change of Seasons (1995); Liquid Tension Experiment 2 (1999); A Change of Seasons (1995); When Dream and Day Unite (1989); Metropolis Pt. 2: Scenes from a Memory (1999); Liquid Tension Experiment (1998); Liquid Tension Experiment (1998); Metropolis Pt. 2: Scenes from a Memory (1999); Falling into Infinity (1997)	12:15: 1:32; 0:23; 1:40; 0:43; 0:56; 0:32; 0:07; 0:08; 1:41; 0:45; 1:01; 0:46; 0:41; 1:20
3.	"Trial of Tears"	Myung	Dream Theater	Falling into Infinity (1997)	13:49
4.	"New Millennium"	Portnoy	Dream Theater	Falling into Infinity (1997)	8:01
5.	"Keyboard Solo"	(instrumental)	Rudess		3:58
6.	"Only a Matter of Time"	Kevin Moore	Dream Theater	When Dream and Day Unite (1989)	7:21

Disc three

No.	Title	Lyrics	Music	Original album (year)	Length
1.	"Goodnight Kiss"	Portnoy		Six Degrees of Inner Turbulence (2002)	6:16
2.	"Solitary Shell"	Petrucci		Six Degrees of Inner Turbulence (2002)	5:58
3.	"Stream of Consciousness"	(instrumental)		Train of Thought (2003)	10:54
4.	"Disappear"	James LaBrie		Six Degrees of Inner Turbulence (2002)	5:56
5.	"Pull Me Under"	Moore	Dream Theater	Images and Words (1992)	8:38
6.	"In the Name of God"	Petrucci		Train of Thought (2003)	15:49

DVD

Disc one The entire Budokan concert:

1. "As I Am" – 8:34
2. "This Dying Soul" – 12:12
3. "Beyond This Life" – 19:34
4. "Hollow Years" – 9:19
5. "War Inside My Head" – 2:30
6. "The Test That Stumped Them All" – 4:53
7. "Endless Sacrifice" – 11:20
8. "Instrumedley" – 12:09
9. "Trial of Tears" – 13:58
10. "New Millennium" – 7:59
11. "Keyboard Solo" – 3:59
12. "Only a Matter of Time" – 7:25
13. "Goodnight Kiss" – 6:14
14. "Solitary Shell" – 5:51
15. "Stream of Consciousness" – 10:55
16. "Disappear" – 5:55
17. "Pull Me Under" – 9:00
18. "In the Name of God" – 17:36
19. Credits – 3:11

Disc two Documentary and Extra Features:

- "Riding The Train Of Thought": Japanese Tour Documentary – 29:46
- John Petrucci "Guitar World" – 6:27
- Jordan Rudess "Keyboard World" – 6:43
- Mike Portnoy Drum Solo – 12:08
- "The Dream Theater Chronicles": 2004 Tour Opening Video – 5:43
- "Instrumedley" Multiangle Bonus – 12:03

Blu-ray

Contains all content from the DVD set on one Blu-ray Disc, with the concert being presented in 1080p and remastered audio and the extra features largely in 480p.

== Personnel ==
Dream Theater

- James LaBrie – lead vocals, percussion
- John Myung – bass, Chapman Stick
- John Petrucci – guitar, backing vocals
- Mike Portnoy – drums, backing vocals
- Jordan Rudess – keyboards

== Charts ==
Chart (2004)	Peak position
Dutch Albums (Album Top 100)	91
German Albums (Offizielle Top 100)	91
Italian Albums (FIMI)	46

== RIAA Certifications ==
These statistics were compiled from the RIAA certification online database. They only apply to the DVD.

- Gold - January 26, 2005
- Platinum - January 26, 2005
