= List of Yamaha signature instruments =

This is a list of Yamaha signature instruments, the signature instruments have been developed by Yamaha together with the artists, some from the ground up while others are based on standard models.

== Guitars ==
=== AES620 SH ===
The Yamaha AES620 SH was the former signature guitar of former Van Halen and current Chickenfoot vocalist Sammy Hagar. The guitar was designed by Hagar together with Yamaha's custom shop in Hollywood California and based on the AES620 with modifications designed by Hagar. The solid body guitar is fitted with two humbuckers, the neck being a standards Yamaha model and the bridge pickup being a Seymour Duncan JB model both being controlled by separate volume controls and a single tone control. The rosewood fretboard also features a Cabo Wabo inlay at the 12th fret. He has recently switched to Gibson guitars, releasing 2 new signature guitars with them.

=== CV820 WB ===
The Yamaha CV820 WB was the former signature guitar for current Limp Bizkit and Black Light Burns guitarist Wes Borland. During his early career with Limp Bizkit, Borland was endorsed by Ibanez but decided to end the collaboration, since Ibanez wanted him to modify one of their current guitars and market as a Wes Borland signature, while Wes himself wanted to be able to design a guitar from the ground up to create his own dream guitar. After leaving, Wes played PRS for a short time before starting his current collaboration with Yamaha guitars.

The semi-hollow guitar is developed by Borland and Yamaha luthier John Gadesi, and built using the Japanese method Takumi-Kezuri (translates to "skillful carving"), which means that the back, the sides and the center-block is constructed out of one piece of alder and fitted with a maple top. The design for the body of the guitar was done by Borland several years earlier, but not made into reality until his partnership with Yamaha. Since leaving Limp Bizkit, Wes moved more towards vintage and semi-hollow body guitars since he likes their resonance and he claims they feel more alive. The guitar is fitted with a three-piece maple neck with a 24 fret rosewood fretboard without markers. The guitar is equipped with two splitfield humbuckers which are controlled by a three way toggle switch and wired straight to two separate volume controls and without any tone controls. He has recently switched to Jackson Guitars.

=== PA1511MS ===
The Yamaha PA1511MS is the current signature guitar of American jazz guitarist Mike Stern, known for his work with Miles Davis. The PA1511MS is based on Sterns own heavily modified Fender Telecaster and features an ash body and maple neck in similar design to the Telecaster. The guitar is fitted with a fixed bridge and single volume and tone controls for the two Seymour Duncan pickups.

=== SA503 TVL ===
The Yamaha SA503 TVL is the signature guitar of Troy Van Leeuwen the former guitarist of A Perfect Circle and current guitarist and multi-instrumentalist of Queens of the Stone Age. The SA503 TVL features a semi-hollow maple body and neck. The guitar is fitted with a Bigsby vibrato tailpiece and three P-90 pickups controlled by two three-way switches. The neck and bridge pickups are controlled by the rear selector, similar to how the switching system of a Gibson Les Paul. The middle pickup is controlled by the front selector which switches between off, on and only. The guitar also features individual volume controls and a master tone control.

Besides Van Leeuwen himself other guitarists such as former Nine Inch Nails guitarist Aaron North, Velvet Revolver's Dave Kushner, fellow Yamaha endorser Wes Borland as well as bandmate Josh Homme have also been known to play the SA503 TVL.

== Bass guitars ==
=== ATT LTDII ===
The Yamaha ATT LTDII is the current signature bass of Billy Sheehan, known for his work with Talas, Steve Vai, David Lee Roth, Mr Big, and Niacin. The ATT LTDII features an alder body with a 21 fret maple neck with Hip Shot detuners. The bass is fitted with two DiMarzio pickups each with their own outputs. Unlike other basses in the BB-series Sheenans signature model does not feature a neck through design since he prefers bolt-on necks. However, for a more durable joint between the neck and body a special joint with aluminium reinforcements was designed. On the latest edition of the Attitude II, however, the aluminium piece was replaced with a large portion of the neck being added and extended and being bolted on from the front under the neck pick-up.

=== BB3000MA ===
The Yamaha BB3000MA is the signature bass for former Van Halen and current Chickenfoot bassist Michael Anthony. The BB3000MA is based on Yamahas neck through BB-series with a more streamlined neck and a body with deeper cutaways. The bass is equipped with one Alnico Split single-coil, one Alnico V Soapbar single coil pickup and Hip Shot detuners.

=== BBNE2 ===
The Yamaha BBNE2 is the signature bass for jazz, rock and rhythm and blues bassist Nathan East, known for his work with Eric Clapton, Phil Collins and Stevie Wonder. The five stringed BBNE2 is based around a double cutaway maple and alder body designed by East with a 24 fret maple and mahogany neck. The bass is fitted with two stacked Alnico humbuckers and a bridge with individual saddles for better intonation. The pickups are controlled by several controls including an equalizer to give the instrument more versatility.

=== RBX6JM ===
The Yamaha RBX6JM was the first of two John Myung-signature six-stringed electric bass for Bassist John Myung of Dream Theater. It was released to the public in 1998 after John Myung had been using Yamaha's "TRB" line of Fretted & XRFretless 6-string Basses for the previous 2 years in the Studio on Tour, and prototypes based on Yamaha's more Rock-based "RBX" line of Basses was used on latter tours in 1997 as well as the recording of their Falling into Infinity album in June & July 1997. This proved to both Yamaha as well as Myung that the "RBX" line-up of Basses could be modified to fit Myung's preferences for tighter string-spacing and his preference for bolt-on construction more easily than the TRB Basses.

A bolt-on bass with alder body and flame-maple top available in either "Ruby Red" or "Turquoise Blue" with a maple neck, ebony fretboard, gold hardware, 35" scale, and "Infinity" fretboard inlay made of various sizes of dot inlays on the fretboard to make a Custom Inlay without the normally associated cost, various Transparent Red and Teal "RBX6JM" models were his main studio and live instruments along with his TRB6 six-string fretless from 1997–2000. Touring Into Infinity, 1998's Once In A LIVEtime double-disc live CD and 5 Years In A LIVEtime video, 1999's Metropolis Pt. 2: Scenes from a Memory, following tour and 2001 releases of their Metropolis 2000: Scenes From New York DVD, VHS and Live Scenes From New York three CD live set from their following Release & Tour

=== RBX6JM2 ===
The Yamaha RBX6JM2 is the second signature model of John Myung, the bassist of Dream Theater.

In 2002 John Myung and Yamaha unveiled the RBX-JM2, an updated version of his signature bass that echoed the redesign of their entire RBX-series of basses. Changes included a modified body shape with more "modern" lines and carvings, finishes in either "Inca Silver" or "Plum Purple" in flat as opposed to glossy paint, slightly tighter string-spacing, a maple neck/rosewood fretboard with "Yin-Yang" inlay at the 12th fret, 34-inch scale as opposed to the 35-inch scale that the RBX6JM had, and most importantly a single Music Man-style Seymour Duncan SMB6A humbucking pickup, by all accounts an influence from his usage of a Music Man StingRay to record a good portion of Dream Theater's Six Degrees of Inner Turbulence.

In July 2007, Myung switched to endorsing Music Man and their new six-string version of the Music Man Bongo bass guitar.

=== TRB JP2 ===
The Yamaha TRB JP2 is the signature bass of John Patitucci, known for his work with Chick Corea, B.B. King and many other artists. This 6-string bass features a double cutaway body made out of maple, ash and alder which allows for access of all 26 frets of the maple neck. The neck's ebony fretboard also features custom mother of pearl and abalone inlays and pearl and gold tuners. The TRB JP2 is fitted with two double-coil Alnico V humbucking pickups controlled by a 5-knob control layout including an active 3-band EQ.
