= Stream of Consciousness (instrumental) =

Instrumental by Dream Theater

from the album Train of Thought
- Released: 2003
- Genre: Progressive metal; instrumental metal
- Length: 11:16
- Label: Elektra Records
- Composers: John Myung; Jordan Rudess; John Petrucci; Mike Portnoy
- Producers: Mike Portnoy; John Petrucci

"Stream of Consciousness" is a song by American progressive metal band Dream Theater, appearing on their 2003 album Train of Thought. The song lasts for 11 minutes and 16 seconds. The song appears as the sixth song on the album, as a direct continuation of Vacant. In fact the main riff is an elaboration of the one of Vacant that was written by John Myung.

The song gets its name from an early working title for the album Falling into Infinity, and the parallel between the concepts of "stream of consciousness" and "train of thought". The song "Lines in the Sand" (from Falling into Infinity) contains the lyrics "In the stream of consciousness, there is a river crying."

The song is a popular inclusion in Dream Theater's live shows and appears on the live album and DVD Live at Budokan.

== Songwriting contest ==
While Dream Theater were in the studio in 2003, recording what would become Train of Thought, they wondered what an outsider would make of their descriptions for how certain sections of the unfinished songs sounded. These descriptions were used on arrangement charts to help with structuring the song before it was recorded. "Stream of Consciousness" had sections described as "Crimson Setup", "U.K. Rise", "Straight Groove x2", etc. They wondered what would happen if someone were given just these descriptions and had to come up with what they believed the finished song would sound like, so they issued a challenge to Dream Theater fans through their websites and message boards to do just that.

Drummer Mike Portnoy posted photographs of the above-mentioned arrangement charts for "SOC" (the full title was not revealed to contestants, and may have been known only as "Suck Our Cocks"), as well as Jordan Rudess' MIDI conductor charts which contained tempos, time signatures and other details for each section of the song. The song is based on John Myung's riff and chord progression on Vacant, that was re-arranged in this faster version by John Petrucci. The entries would be judged on songwriting excellence and closeness to the real "Stream of Consciousness", as judged by the band members themselves, and the prize for the winner included having their song played over the PA before Dream Theater concerts, four backstage passes to any Dream Theater show on that tour, a signed copy of the upcoming Train of Thought, and three releases from Portnoy's YtseJam Records.

The contest began and after a number of months dozens of entries had been received. The band listened to and judged the entries over the course of the next world tour, and the winner was announced to be a composition by Andy Rowland and Ant Law.

Impressed by the caliber of entries in the contest, Dream Theater released a CD of their favorite entries through the Dream Theater International Fan Club.

In 2007, this CD was put up on the internet as fake rehearsal tracks labeled as "Systematic Chaos Working Demos" or "Systematic Chaos Instrumental Demos".

=== Contest winners/album track list ===
1. Andy Rowland & Ant Law – SOC (12:15)
2. Daisuke Kurosawa – Deoxyribo Nucleic Acid (10:58)
3. Linear Sphere – Scent of Carbonite (11:19)
4. Richard Campbell – SOC (11:12)
5. Brian Wherry – SOC (10:59)
6. Redemption – SOC (10:50)
7. Eric Clemenzi – SOC (10:29)

== Personnel ==
- John Petrucci – guitar
- Jordan Rudess – keyboards
- John Myung – bass
- Mike Portnoy – drums
