= Metropolis—Part I: "The Miracle and the Sleeper" =

"Metropolis—Part I"

Promotional single by Dream Theater

from the album Images and Words
- Released: 1992
- Recorded: October 1991 – December 1991
- Studio: Bear Tracks Studio in Suffern, New York
- Genre: Progressive metal
- Length: 9:32
- Label: Atco
- Composers: James LaBrie; Kevin Moore; John Myung; John Petrucci; Mike Portnoy
- Lyricist: John Petrucci
- Producer: David Prater

Music video
- Live at Luna Park on YouTube

"Metropolis—Part I: 'The Miracle and the Sleeper'" (often shortened to "Metropolis I") is a song by American progressive metal band Dream Theater, from their 1992 album Images and Words.

It was released as a promotional one-track cassette.

== History ==
"Metropolis—Part I: 'The Miracle and the Sleeper'" was originally known as "Crumbling Metropolis." Sometime around 1989, "Crumbling" was dropped. "Part I" in the title was originally added by John Petrucci as a joke, as no sequel was ever intended. As fan demands began to increase, however, the popularity of the song eventually led to a second song being written. The second song was originally conceived as a twenty-minute epic for Falling into Infinity; it was cut from that album at an early state, before the song was completed. Lyrics for "Metropolis Pt. 2" were never written and the only recording of the whole song is a rough rehearsal. These song bits evolved into their own album, Metropolis Pt. 2: Scenes from a Memory.

Lyrically, Petrucci described the song as "very arbitrary", "fictional and kind of abstract".

== Live performances ==
Much like "Pull Me Under", "Metropolis" is one of the band's most popular live songs, and is played often and with many variations. The song instantly became a live favorite even before the song's actual release, opening many of Dream Theater's early shows. The song was originally written when original singer Charlie Dominici was in the band, and was played live at every show in 1989, although this version had a different intro and a slightly shorter outro. In recent years, it has often been performed as the final encore, allowing the band to extend the solo section and James LaBrie to address the crowd. This version was released on Live at Luna Park. Metropolis has also been played as part of many medleys, including "Metropolis"/"Learning to Live"/"The Crimson Sunset", which closed Once in a LIVEtime, the "Instrumedley", which was included on the Live at Budokan album, and "Pullmeopolis", a mashup with "Pull Me Under" that has never been commercially released. In total, it has been played live 725 times as of May 2026, making it Dream Theater's second most played song after "Pull Me Under".

== Use in media ==
"Metropolis" is featured in the 2015 music video game Rock Band 4.

== Track listing ==
All lyrics are written by John Petrucci; all music is composed by Dream Theater.

No.	Title	Length
1.	"Metropolis"	9:30

== Personnel ==
=== Dream Theater ===
- James LaBrie – lead vocals
- Kevin Moore – keyboards
- John Myung – bass
- John Petrucci – guitars
- Mike Portnoy – drums, percussion

== Releases ==
- Cassette, Single, Promo – Atco, US 1992
