= Systematic Chaos =

2007 studio album by Dream Theater

Studio album by Dream Theater
- Released: June 4, 2007
- Recorded: September 2006 – February 2007
- Studio: Avatar (New York, New York)
- Genre: Progressive metal
- Length: 78:41
- Label: Roadrunner
- Producer: John Petrucci; Mike Portnoy

Dream Theater chronology
Score (2006)	Systematic Chaos (2007)	Greatest Hit (...And 21 Other Pretty Cool Songs) (2008)

Singles from Systematic Chaos
- 1. "Constant Motion" Released: April 27, 2007; 2. "Forsaken" Released: March 31, 2008

Systematic Chaos is the ninth studio album by American progressive metal band Dream Theater. Released on June 4, 2007 in the United Kingdom and June 5, 2007 in the United States, Systematic Chaos was the band's first release through Roadrunner Records, which was sold to their previous label Atlantic Records, through which the band had released their previous studio album Octavarium (2005). The album was recorded from September 2006 to February 2007 at Avatar Studios in New York City, after the band's first break from summer touring in ten years. The lyrics of the album were written by John Petrucci, James LaBrie, and Mike Portnoy about fictional, political, and personal topics, respectively.

The album peaked in the top twenty in eight countries' sales charts; in addition, the album peaked at the nineteenth position on the Billboard 200, making it the highest peaking Dream Theater album in the United States until the release of Black Clouds & Silver Linings (2009), which debuted at the sixth position. Critical reception of the album was generally positive; Jon Eardley from MetalReview.com called the band, "arguably the most consistent band throughout the entire progressive rock/metal industry".

Dream Theater promoted the album on their Chaos in Motion world tour, which lasted a year and spanned 35 countries. The album was released in regular and special edition formats; the special edition included a 5.1 surround sound mix of the album, in addition to a 90-minute "making of" documentary about the album.

== Background ==
After recording their twentieth anniversary concert, Score, on April 1, 2006, Dream Theater rested for its first summer in ten years. The band would reconvene at Avatar Studios, in New York City, in September 2006, where they previously recorded Falling into Infinity in 1997. Mike Portnoy stated that the relationship between band members was "the best it's ever been". The band hired Paul Northfield, who had previously worked with bands that had inspired Dream Theater, including Rush and Queensrÿche, to engineer the album. As with previous albums, Dream Theater simultaneously wrote and recorded Systematic Chaos. Mike Portnoy and John Petrucci co-produced the album; Portnoy said that the band hires an engineer and a mixer to act as an "objective outside ear", but the members ultimately "call their own shots". Previous Dream Theater albums shared planned themes throughout, such as Metropolis Pt. 2: Scenes from a Memory (1999) as a concept album or Train of Thought (2003) as a heavy, "balls to the wall" album. Though Portnoy had some preconceived ideas for Systematic Chaos, he decided not to tell the rest of the band; leaving them to start with a "completely open palate". However, Portnoy did want to retain a "cutting, aggressive, modern" mood throughout, "It had to have balls," he added, "it had to be cool".

The album was titled Systematic Chaos after Portnoy and Petrucci picked phrases from song lyrics that they felt would be a fitting title, in similar fashion to previous albums like Images and Words (1992) or Awake (1994). The pair selected the word "chaos", which appears in "The Dark Eternal Night". Petrucci and Portnoy were also attracted to the phrase "Random thoughts of neat disorder" which appears in "Constant Motion". Opposites of the word "chaos" were discussed, resulting in the word "systematic". Portnoy said that in addition to the album, "systematic chaos" is also a "fitting description of the band in general".

== Songs ==
John Petrucci wrote the lyrics for five of the eight songs on the album, telling a fictional story through each one.

=== In the Presence of Enemies ===
The first piece recorded, the twenty-five-minute epic "In the Presence of Enemies," was described by Petrucci as the "epitome of a Dream Theater creation". He went on to describe the composition as "very progressive, very long"; also noting that it set a good tone for writing and recording the rest of the album. Their longest recording since "Six Degrees of Inner Turbulence", it was split into two parts, due to it having a good open and close for the album at the same time. According to Portnoy, the band felt it was too long to open the album, but did not want to close the album with a long song, as they had with the twenty-four-minute title track of their last album Octavarium (2005). The songs are normally played together in their entirety in live shows. During recording, the work was titled, "The Pumpkin King," and in the album's booklet, the song is given a subtitle, "The Heretic and the Dark Master."

The story of "In the Presence of Enemies" was inspired by a Korean manhwa named Priest, as Petrucci explains that not being a manga fan, precisely, "[...] I like it though. This one, I just stumbled upon and I really liked the content. It inspired me to take a different approach lyrically. You have to keep things interesting for yourself when writing new material so I just took this and ran with it. [...] Those types of lyrics are fun to write, you know? The dark subject matter, the dark master stuff. It's another way of writing, a fresh one to me." He also summarizes the lyrics: "It's a story about somebody who loses himself and end struggles with the darkness, symbolized by the Dark Master. And the story ends up really being the darkness within and goes through the different phases where he has to fight demons and things like that.

=== Forsaken ===
Petrucci said "Forsaken" is a story told through a "short song structure". The song tells of a person who is visited at night by a vampiress. While the man thinks he is being taken away and being shown "wonderful things", he doesn't realize that the whole time he is getting his blood sucked, and is eventually taken, in the end, by the vampiress. An animated music video of "Forsaken", produced by Gonzo and directed by Yasufumi Soejima, was released on January 26, 2008. The band allowed Soejima artistic freedom with the design of the video, which was set in a science fiction future instead of the present day. During the production of the album, the working title for this song was "Jet Lag", and it was the sixth song to be written.

=== Constant Motion ===
"Constant Motion"
Excerpt from the ending of the first chorus and beginning of the second verse from the song and first single from Systematic Chaos, "Constant Motion"

"Constant Motion" was released as the first single from the album on April 27, 2007. It was first made available as a free download the same day by Roadrunner Records; it could be found at Roadrunner Records' Dream Theater sub-website for a limited time. This song was also made available to download for the music video game Rock Band. The song is considered as one of the hardest songs available for the game on both Guitar and Drums. Its working title was "Korma Chameleon", and was the second piece written.

Mike Portnoy said that since it was one of the more aggressive, more driving songs on the album, that the lyrics were very much a metaphor for his Obsessive Compulsive Disorder. With everything he does for Dream Theater as well as his life in general, that his "wheels are always in constant motion", and that he's always juggling many different projects or responsibilities for the band at the same time. So the lyrics are a representation for whats going on in his head on any given day.

The song was also accompanied by a music video, the first the band had produced in over a decade. The video clip premiered on July 13, 2007 and was released as a free download, in two different formats, also for a limited time. The band had not produced a music video since "Hollow Years" from Falling into Infinity (1997), citing lack of interest and lack of rotation on music channels for the latter. The video received considerable airplay on MTV2's Headbangers Ball and was voted as the second best music video of 2007 by the same; it is arguably Dream Theater's most popular video since "Pull Me Under" in 1992.

=== The Dark Eternal Night ===
Petrucci wrote the lyrics to "The Dark Eternal Night" about a pharaoh who has returned after dormancy as a monster to haunt a town. The lyrics are heavily influenced by the short story "Nyarlathotep" by American horror fiction writer H.P. Lovecraft, even borrowing a lot of specific phrases from this story. The song contains an improvised continuum solo, performed by Rudess while the drum tracks were being recorded; the band members liked the solo enough to keep in the final recording. In the October 2010 issue of Total Guitar Magazine, its readers voted the main riff of "The Dark Eternal Night" as the fourth greatest riff of the decade. During the making of the song, the title was, "N.A.D.S." ("North American Dream Squad") and it was the fifth song to be written.

The sprawling, progressive midsection was not featured in the song's original edit, but is based around a riff that Rudess came up with in the control room, when listening to the original, more conservative instrumental section. "I was debating whether or not I should even bring it up, but then I got brave and said 'You know, I've got this weird idea.'"

The Dark Eternal Night was the second of two songs released to the general public in advance of the album's release, with an in-studio video being released to YouTube in May 2007.

=== Repentance ===
Portnoy wrote "Repentance" as the fourth part of his Twelve-step Suite, a collection of songs from various Dream Theater albums which revolve around his journey through Alcoholics Anonymous. The song discusses steps eight and nine of the process, which deal with making a list of people whom one has wronged and, if possible, making direct amends with them. Portnoy, who as of 2007 had been sober for 7½ years, invited friends and fellow musicians Mikael Åkerfeldt, Jon Anderson, David Ellefson, Daniel Gildenlöw, Steve Hogarth, Chris Jericho, Neal Morse, Joe Satriani, Corey Taylor, Steve Vai, and Steven Wilson to record spoken apologies, regrets, and sorrows of their own, which were featured throughout the song. Portnoy dedicated "Repentance", "to Bill W. and all of his friends". During recording, the title of the track was, "Fisheye" and it was the seventh and final song to be written. This saga is concluded in the band's tenth studio album Black Clouds & Silver Linings with "The Shattered Fortress".

=== Prophets of War ===
"Prophets of War" was written by James LaBrie, who based the lyrics loosely on Joseph C. Wilson's book The Politics of Truth. The lyrics talk about possible ulterior motives behind the Iraq War, while remaining "middle of the road". The title is a play on words, where the "prophets" of the war, could also be gaining a "profit" from the War. During the recording of the song, Portnoy suggested fans could voice certain lyrical chants. In response to a message posted on the band's website four hundred fans gathered outside the recording studio to record the chanting, however only sixty could fit into the studio. The title of the track during recording was, "Carpet Babies" and it was the third song to be written.

=== The Ministry of Lost Souls ===
At 14:57, "The Ministry of Lost Souls" is the album's second longest track. Throughout the song's lyrics, Petrucci tells of a person who dies in the process of saving a woman from drowning. However, the woman who is saved is filled with "regret and sorrow" until she is able to re-unite with her rescuer. The title for the track during recording was, "Schindler's Lisp" and it was the fourth song to be written.

== Release and promotion ==
Both the regular and special editions of Systematic Chaos were released on June 4, 2007 in the UK and June 5, 2007 in the US. Over their seven album relationship with Warner Music Group, Dream Theater became disappointed at the lack of coverage they gave the band. "[...] Our previous label basically relied on our fanbase to do everything. [They would] put the money up for the record and put the CD in the shops," said Portnoy. On February 8, 2007, Dream Theater reached an agreement with Roadrunner Records to release their new album. Systematic Chaos had nearly been written and recorded at the time of the signing. Ironically, Warner purchased Roadrunner Records a week after the band signed with them. According to LaBrie, Roadrunner followed through on all of its promises to the band concerning the promotion of the album.

Portnoy spent a month directing and editing a documentary titled Chaos in Progress: The Making of Systematic Chaos, which was released on the two disc special edition of the album. The bonus disc of the special edition also included 5.1 surround sound mix of the entire album. Dream Theater supported the album by touring on the Chaos in Motion Tour from June 3, 2007 to June 4, 2008. The world tour comprised 115 shows throughout thirty-five countries. Multiple concerts were filmed for the band's fifth DVD, titled Chaos in Motion 2007–2008. The compilation of concerts was released on September 30, 2008.

== Reception ==
Professional ratings
Review scores
Source	Rating
About.com	4/5 stars
AllMusic	3.5/5 stars
Dangerdog	5/5 stars
The Metal Forge	8/10 stars
Metal Review	8.7/10 stars
Metal Storm	8.2/10 stars
Metally	4.5/5 stars
411mania.com	9.5/10 stars
Chronicles of Chaos	9/10 stars

Critical reception for Systematic Chaos was generally positive. Writing for MetalReview.com, Jon Eardley called the album, "another solid outing". He complimented Petrucci for "Constant Motion", writing that it contains "some of the best riffs Petrucci has brought to the table". In addition, he called the latter part of "The Dark Eternal Night" "the most brutal part in any song to date". Reviewing for Metal Invader, Nikos Patelis called the album, "energetic, sharp – edged, full of beautiful melodies and heavy riffs, long epic compositions". He called Dream Theater's instrumentalists "four masters of music that use their instruments as if they were their limbs", in addition to stating, "James LaBrie sounds more mature than ever". In conclusion, Patelis called Systematic Chaos, "an excellent album that needs many times to be listened in order to be digested". Greg Prato, of AllMusic, wrote "[...] 'Forsaken' proves wrong those who say that Dream Theater is all about instrumental gymnastics and not songwriting". He also compared riffs in "The Dark Eternal Night" to the band Pantera. Overall, he states "[...] the quintet sticks to the prog metal game plan that they've followed since their inception". Reviewer Chad Bowar of About.com, wrote that "In the Presence of Enemies - Part I" is "an effective way to set the tone for the rest of the songs". Overall, Bowar gave the album four out of five stars, calling it, "one of the best Dream Theater releases in quite a while".

The album peaked in the top twenty-five in the United Kingdom and Australia, where the band had never previously charted. In the United States, the album peaked at the nineteenth position on the Billboard 200, making it the highest peaking Dream Theater album in the United States at the time of its release. Overall, Systematic Chaos peaked in the top twenty for album sales in eight countries. In the US, the album sold 35,689 copies the first week it was released.

In 2014, readers of Rhythm magazine voted Systematic Chaos the second greatest drumming album in the history of progressive rock.

== Track listing ==
All music is composed by Dream Theater.

No.	Title	Lyrics	Length
1.	"In the Presence of Enemies - Part I": "I. Prelude"; "II. Resurrection"	John Petrucci	9:00
2.	"Forsaken"	Petrucci	5:35
3.	"Constant Motion"	Mike Portnoy	6:55
4.	"The Dark Eternal Night"	Petrucci	8:53
5.	"Repentance": "VIII. Regret"; "IX. Restitution"	Portnoy	10:43
6.	"Prophets of War"	James LaBrie	6:00
7.	"The Ministry of Lost Souls"	Petrucci	14:57
8.	"In the Presence of Enemies - Part II": "III. Heretic"; "IV. The Slaughter of the Damned"; "V. The Reckoning"; "VI. Salvation"	Petrucci	16:38
Total length:			78:41

=== Special edition bonus DVD ===
- Complete album in 5.1 surround sound
- Chaos in Progress: the making of Systematic Chaos

== Personnel ==
Dream Theater

- James LaBrie – lead vocals
- John Myung – bass
- John Petrucci – guitar, backing vocals, producer
- Mike Portnoy – drums, percussion, backing vocals, co-lead vocals on "Constant Motion" and "The Dark Eternal Night", producer
- Jordan Rudess – keyboards, Continuum

Guest spoken words on "Repentance"

- Corey Taylor
- Steve Vai
- Chris Jericho
- David Ellefson
- Daniel Gildenlöw
- Steve Hogarth
- Joe Satriani
- Mikael Åkerfeldt
- Steven Wilson
- Jon Anderson (melodic mantra)
- Neal Morse

Production

- Paul Northfield – engineer, mixing, vocal track co-producer
- Vladimir Meller – mastering
- Chad "Sir Chadwick" Lupo – assistant engineer
- Hugh Syme – art direction, design, illustration
- Daragh McDonagh – photography

== Chart positions ==
Chart (2007)	Peak position
Australian Albums (ARIA Charts)	23
Austrian Albums (Ö3 Austria)	20
Belgian Albums (Ultratop Flanders)	44
Belgian Albums (Ultratop Wallonia)	40
Canadian Albums (Billboard)	15
Czech Albums (ČNS IFPI)	33
Dutch Albums (Album Top 100)	2
Finnish Albums Chart (Suomen virallinen lista)	3
French Albums (SNEP)	14
German Albums (Offizielle Top 100)	7
Hungarian Albums (MAHASZ)	1
Irish Albums (IRMA)	53
Italian Albums (FIMI)	2
Japanese Albums (Oricon)	12
Norwegian Albums (VG-lista)	3
Portuguese Albums (AFP)	23
Scottish Albums (OCC)	26
Spanish Albums (Promusicae)	26
Swedish Albums (Sverigetopplistan)	5
Swiss Albums (Schweizer Hitparade)	14
UK Albums (OCC)	25
US Billboard 200	19

== Notes ==
- James LaBrie, John Myung, John Petrucci, Mike Portnoy, Jordan Rudess (2007). Chaos in Progress: The Making of Systematic Chaos (Documentary). Avatar Studios: The All Blacks.
- Mike Portnoy (May 4, 2007). The Mirror Interviews Mike Portnoy. TheMirror.de. Archived from the original on November 16, 2021.
