= Jamshied Sharifi =

American composer and musician (1960–2025)

- Born: October 17, 1960; Topeka, Kansas, U.S.
- Died: August 15, 2025 (aged 64)
- Genres: Classical music, symphonic rock
- Occupations: Composer, musical conductor, musician, record producer
- Instruments: Piano, guitar, percussion, flute
- Years active: 1965–2025
- Website: www.JamshiedSharifi.com

Jamshied Sharifi (October 17, 1960 – August 15, 2025) was an American Tony Award-winning composer, conductor, musician and record producer.

== Life and career ==
Born in Topeka, Kansas to an Iranian father and an American mother, Sharifi was exposed to music at an early age, learning Jazz and Middle Eastern music through his father and European classical and church music through his mother. He began to study classical piano at age five and quickly developed a thirst for musical instruction and a desire to improvise. At age nine he began studying guitar and drums, and at age ten added flute.

After graduating from the Massachusetts Institute of Technology with a degree in humanities, Sharifi went on to further his musical education at Berklee College of Music in Boston. At Berklee, he studied Jazz Piano and Composition as well as Film Scoring, and in 1983, he received the Outstanding Jazz Pianist award at the Collegiate Jazz Festival held at the University of Notre Dame. He studied with noted trumpeter and Charlie Parker sideman Herb Pomeroy, and after graduation from Berklee, Pomeroy asked Sharifi to lead the MIT Festival Jazz Ensemble, a post Pomeroy had held for twenty-two years. From 1985–1992, under Sharifi's direction and leadership, the group recorded two CDs, performed twenty of his compositions, and won the prestigious Notre Dame Collegiate Jazz Festival in 1991. During this time, Sharifi also taught in the Music Synthesis and Ensemble Departments at Berklee. In 1992, he left his teaching positions in Boston and moved to New York City in search of new musical endeavors and opportunities.

Sharifi began to focus his attention on film soundtracks. His foray into the world of film and television began as a keyboardist and orchestrator for Michael Gibbs. Together they scored three feature films and fifteen one-hour television shows. Sharifi went on to compose the soundtracks to many major studio and independent films including Muppets From Space, Down To Earth, Nickelodeon film Harriet the Spy and the Paramount/Nickelodeon film Clockstoppers, and contributed to the scores of The Thomas Crown Affair, and The Rugrats Movie.

And while Sharifi's initial focus in music can be credited to American jazz, it is his infusions of elements from the Middle East and Africa that make his music distinctive. He was an accomplished pianist and synthesizer player. Notably, Sharifi held the synthesizer to an 'acoustic' standard and aimed to play it with the detail and richness of articulation that comes naturally to an acoustic instrumentalist. To achieve this sound he used a controller which allowed him to manipulate the synthesizer with his breath. He combined this technique with a ribbon controller that allowed him to bend the pitch smoothly and continuously with his finger. According to Jamshied, using both these techniques makes the instrument a "wind-driven, fretless synthesizer".

In addition to creating his own albums and scoring films, Sharifi has arranged and produced albums for many artists, including Tibetan vocalist Yungchen Lhamo, and Persian vocalist Mamak Khadem. He has also recorded four albums with world fusion band Mo Boma. His first solo album, A Prayer for the Soul of Layla, received critical acclaim including Best Contemporary World Music Album at the 1st Annual New Age Voice Music Awards. His next release One continues to explore his inimitable approach to music. "For both One and A Prayer for the Soul of Layla, the inspiration has been to make music true to my heart and interests" said Sharifi. "I have had the opportunity to work on a number of different musical projects, very often helping another artist to realize his or her vision. These records reflect my ongoing love for and exploration of music outside of what we think of as Western music.”

For Dream Theater's album Octavarium, he arranged and conducted for various orchestra instruments, including strings and horns. On April 1, 2006, he conducted the orchestra for the Dream Theater 20th Anniversary World Tour performance at Radio City Music Hall in NYC. This concert was released on the Dream Theater CD/DVD Score.

Sharifi's first record, A Prayer for the Soul of Layla, was inspired by his daughter, Layla Sakamoto Sharifi.

He won a Tony Award in 2018 for orchestrating the stage adaptation of The Band's Visit.

Sharifi died on August 15, 2025, at the age of 64, after a long battle with cancer.

== Discography ==
- A Prayer for the Soul of Layla (Alula Records)
- ONE (Ceres)
- Score (conducting the "Octavarium Orchestra")

== Appearance in film ==
Three of Sharifi's songs – "The Complicated Man", "UFO Get-Go" and "Back Porch" – appeared in the film The Thomas Crown Affair.

At the request of MIT Wind Ensemble music director Frederick Harris, Sharifi composed music about the Arab Spring for a spring concert which PBS affiliate WGBH filmed and aired on May 31, 2013. The film won a New England Emmy Award.

For MIT's 2020 virtual commencement ceremony, Sharifi's "To the Light, To the Flame" was recorded by dozens of musicians from remote locations during quarantine.

For MIT's 2021 virtual commencement ceremony, Sharifi's "Diary of a Pandemic Year" was recorded by dozens of musicians at several venues on MIT's campus.
