= Once in a LIVEtime =

1998 live album by Dream Theater

Live album by Dream Theater
- Released: October 27, 1998
- Recorded: June 25, 1998
- Venues: Le Bataclan (Paris, France)
- Genres: Progressive metal; progressive rock
- Length: 154:09
- Label: EastWest
- Producer: Kevin Shirley

Dream Theater chronology
Falling into Infinity (1997)	Once in a LIVEtime (1998)	Metropolis Pt. 2: Scenes from a Memory (1999)

Professional ratings
Review scores
Source	Rating
AllMusic	3/5 stars
Collector's Guide to Heavy Metal	7/10
Scream Magazine	3/6

Once in a LIVEtime is the second live album by American progressive metal band Dream Theater, released in 1998. It is their second live release. It was produced and recorded by Kevin Shirley during the European leg of the Touring into Infinity world tour, at the Bataclan theater in Paris.

Jay Beckenstein of Spyro Gyra plays alto saxophone on "Take Away My Pain". Beckenstein had previously played on the song "Another Day" on the album Images and Words.

The album cover, one of two designed by Storm Thorgerson for the band, shows an overhead view of the ancient Roman theatre in Orange, France set into a head of a monk. Like Falling into Infinity it does not feature the band's traditional logo due to Thorgerson's distaste in working with existing band logo designs. When Dream and Day Unite and Dream Theater are the only other albums without the classic font (although the font can be seen on the spine of Dream Theater).

== Track listing ==
All music is composed by Dream Theater, except where noted.

Disc one
No.	Title	Lyrics	Original album	Length
1.	"A Change of Seasons I: The Crimson Sunrise"	(instrumental)	A Change of Seasons	3:56
2.	"A Change of Seasons II: Innocence"	Mike Portnoy	A Change of Seasons	3:05
3.	"Puppies on Acid"	(instrumental)	N/A	1:24
4.	"Just Let Me Breathe"	Portnoy	Falling into Infinity	5:53
5.	"Voices"	John Petrucci	Awake	10:34
6.	"Take the Time"	Dream Theater	Images and Words	12:20
7.	"Derek Sherinian Piano Solo" (music: Derek Sherinian)	(instrumental)	N/A	1:54
8.	"Lines in the Sand"	Petrucci	Falling into Infinity	13:13
9.	"Scarred"	Petrucci	Awake	9:27
10.	"A Change of Seasons IV: The Darkest of Winters"	(instrumental)	A Change of Seasons	3:17
11.	"Ytse Jam" (music: Petrucci, John Myung, Kevin Moore, Portnoy)	(instrumental)	When Dream and Day Unite	4:09
12.	"Mike Portnoy Drum Solo" (music: Portnoy)	(instrumental)	N/A	6:59

Disc two
No.	Title	Lyrics	Original album	Length
1.	"Trial of Tears"	Myung	Falling into Infinity	14:11
2.	"Hollow Years"	Petrucci	Falling into Infinity	7:01
3.	"Take Away My Pain"	Petrucci	Falling into Infinity	6:16
4.	"Caught in a Web"	James LaBrie, Petrucci	Awake	5:16
5.	"Lie"	Moore	Awake	6:45
6.	"Peruvian Skies"	Petrucci	Falling into Infinity	7:50
7.	"John Petrucci Guitar Solo" (music: Petrucci)	(instrumental)	N/A	8:06
8.	"Pull Me Under"	Moore	Images and Words	8:15
9.	"Metropolis"	Petrucci	Images and Words	6:16
10.	"Learning to Live"	Myung	Images and Words	4:13
11.	"A Change of Seasons VII: The Crimson Sunset"	Portnoy	A Change of Seasons	3:49

== Actual setlist ==
The actual setlist of this concert was: (as taken from Portnoy's concert database) (a / means "segueing into")

- A Clockwork Orange (Intro Tape) (not released)
- The Crimson Sunrise
- Innocence
- Puppies on Acid
- Just Let Me Breathe
- Burning My Soul (only released on 5 Years in a Livetime VHS/DVD)
- Voices
- Under a Glass Moon (not released)
- Piano Solo
- Lines in the Sand
- The Way It Used to Be (not released)
- Scarred
- The Darkest of Winters
- The Ytse Jam (w/ Drum Solo)
- Take The Time/Freebird (Lynyrd Skynyrd cover)
- Anna Lee (not released)
- Hollow Years
- Speak to Me (not released)
- Hey You (Pink Floyd cover) (not released)
- Goodbye Yellow Brick Road (Elton John cover) (not released)
- Cover My Eyes (not released)
- Take Away My Pain
- Trial of Tears
- Caught in a Web
- Lie
- Peruvian Skies (w/ "Have a Cigar" (Pink Floyd) & "Enter Sandman" (Metallica))
- Guitar Solo (w/ Paradigm Shift & Flight of the Bumblebee)
- Pull Me Under
- Encore: Metropolis Pt.1
- Learning to Live
- The Crimson Sunset

== Covers and tributes ==
Throughout the album, parts of songs originally recorded by other artists are played by the band.

- The segue from "Burning My Soul" into "Voices" features John Petrucci playing the first half of John Williams' "Force Theme" from Star Wars.
- The ending of "Take the Time" contains the solo from Lynyrd Skynyrd's "Freebird" and the main riff from Led Zeppelin's "Moby Dick".
- "Derek Sherinian Piano Solo" contains themes that would later be used in the track "Platt Opus" by Platypus (a progressive rock supergroup of which Sherinian and John Myung were members).
- Before the beginning of "Trial of Tears", and at the end of the song, Petrucci plays the famous five tone motif from the film Close Encounters of the Third Kind. The opening of the same song contains portions of the Rush songs "Xanadu" and "The Trees" played by Mike Portnoy.
- "Peruvian Skies" contains portions of Pink Floyd's "Have a Cigar" and Metallica's "Enter Sandman".
- "John Petrucci Guitar Solo" contains portions of Liquid Tension Experiment's "Paradigm Shift" (a progressive rock supergroup of which Portnoy and Petrucci are members), Nikolai Rimsky-Korsakov's "Flight of the Bumblebee", and themes that would later be used in "Gemini", which appeared on Petrucci's 2020 solo album Terminal Velocity.

== Personnel ==
- James LaBrie – lead vocals, percussion
- John Myung – bass
- John Petrucci – guitars, backing vocals
- Mike Portnoy – drums, percussion, backing vocals
- Derek Sherinian – keyboards

=== Additional personnel ===
- Jay Beckenstein – alto saxophone on "Take Away My Pain"

=== Technical personnel ===
- Kevin Shirley - engineering, production
- Alex Goodison - assistant engineer
- Ian Dyckoff - assistant engineer
- Rich Alvy - assistant engineer
- Leon Zervos - mastering at Absolute Audio, New York City

== Charts ==
Chart (1998)	Peak position
Dutch Albums (Album Top 100)	58
German Albums (Offizielle Top 100)	59
US Billboard 200	157
