= Chaos in Motion 2007–2008 =

2008 video album by Dream Theater

Video by Dream Theater
- Released: September 30, 2008
- Recorded: August 18, 2007; August 21, 2007; October 9, 2007; January 18, 2008; March 4, 2008; May 6, 2008
- Venues: Molson Amphitheater (Toronto); Bank of America Pavilion (Boston); Rotterdam Ahoy (Rotterdam); Bangkok Hall (Bangkok); Luna Park (Buenos Aires); Orpheum Theater (Vancouver)
- Genres: Progressive metal; progressive rock
- Length: 187:15 (film); 163:23 (live album)
- Label: Roadrunner

Dream Theater chronology
Greatest Hit (...And 21 Other Pretty Cool Songs) (2008)	Chaos in Motion 2007–2008 (2008)	Black Clouds & Silver Linings (2009)

Professional ratings
Review scores
Source	Rating
About.com	3.5/5 stars
Blistering	8.5/10 stars
The Metal Forge	8.5/10 stars

Chaos in Motion 2007–2008 is the sixth video album by American progressive metal band Dream Theater. Released on September 30, 2008, the DVD contains a compilation of live concerts from the band's Chaos in Motion Tour, in support of their 9th studio album Systematic Chaos. This was also the band's last official live album to be released with their founding member and drummer Mike Portnoy before his departure from the band in September 2010. The tour, which lasted from June 3, 2007, to June 4, 2008, contained 115 shows throughout 35 countries. Two forms of the DVD were released, a 2-disc set and a 5-disc (2 DVD, 3 CD) special edition. The special edition was limited to 5,000 copies.

== Recordings ==
- August 18, 2007 at Molson Amphitheater in Toronto: "Blind Faith", "Surrounded (Extended Version)"
- August 21, 2007 at Bank of America Pavilion in Boston: "Jordan Rudess Keyboard Solo", "Lines in the Sand", "Scarred"
- October 9, 2007 at Rotterdam Ahoy in The Netherlands: "Intro/Also Sprach Zarathustra", "Constant Motion", "The Dark Eternal Night", "In the Presence of Enemies"
- January 18, 2008 at Bangkok Hall in Bangkok: "Take the Time"
- March 4, 2008 at Luna Park in Buenos Aires: "Panic Attack"
- May 6, 2008 at Orpheum Theater in Vancouver: "Forsaken", "The Ministry of Lost Souls", "Schmedley Wilcox"

== Track listing ==
=== DVD ===
Disc one

1. Intro/Also sprach Zarathustra
2. Constant Motion
3. Panic Attack
4. Blind Faith
5. Surrounded
6. The Dark Eternal Night
7. Keyboard Solo
8. Lines in the Sand
9. Scarred
10. Forsaken
11. The Ministry of Lost Souls
12. Take the Time
13. In the Presence of Enemies
14. Schmedley Wilcox:
  - I. Trial of Tears
  - II. Finally Free
  - III. Learning to Live
  - IV. In the Name of God
  - V. Octavarium: V - Razor's Edge

Disc two

- "Behind the Chaos on the Road" (90-minute Documentary)
- Promo videos
1. Constant Motion
2. Forsaken
3. Forsaken (Studio Footage)
4. The Dark Eternal Night (Studio Footage)
- Live Screen Projection Films:
1. The Dark Eternal Night (N.A.D.S.)
2. The Ministry of Lost Souls
3. In the Presence of Enemies, Pt. 2
- "Mike Portnoy Stage Tour"
- "Mike Portnoy Backstage Tour"
- Photo Gallery

=== Special edition CD ===
The Special Edition 5-disc set includes the 2 DVDs as specified above as well as the audio tracks on a 3-disc set. All music written by Dream Theater except where noted.

Disc one
No.	Title	Lyrics	Length
1.	"Intro/Also sprach Zarathustra" (music: Richard Strauss)	(instrumental)	3:04
2.	"Constant Motion"	Mike Portnoy	7:06
3.	"Panic Attack"	John Petrucci	7:22
4.	"Blind Faith"	James LaBrie	10:29
5.	"Surrounded"	Kevin Moore	15:21

Disc two
No.	Title	Lyrics	Length
1.	"The Dark Eternal Night"	Petrucci	9:44
2.	"Jordan Rudess Keyboard Solo" (music: Jordan Rudess)	(instrumental)	4:53
3.	"Lines in the Sand"	Petrucci	11:56
4.	"Scarred"	Petrucci	13:31
5.	"Forsaken"	Petrucci	5:41
6.	"The Ministry of Lost Souls"	Petrucci	15:22

Disc three
No.	Title	Lyrics	Length
1.	"Take the Time"	Dream Theater	11:37
2.	"In the Presence of Enemies"	Petrucci	26:00
3.	"Schmedley Wilcox": I. "Trial of Tears"; II. "Finally Free"; III. "Learning to Live"; IV. "In the Name of God"; V. "Octavarium: V - Razor's Edge"	Petrucci, John Myung, Portnoy: Myung; Portnoy; Myung; Petrucci; Petrucci	21:18: 8:20; 2:22; 1:54; 4:46; 3:54

== Personnel ==
Dream Theater

- James LaBrie – lead vocals
- John Myung – bass
- John Petrucci – guitars, vocals, producer
- Mike Portnoy – drums, vocals, producer
- Jordan Rudess – keyboards

Production

- Sebastian Beloch – director, editing, filmmaker
- Andrew Bennett – director
- Lasse Hoile – director
- Jared Kvitka – engineer
- Randy Lane – engineer, mixing
- Kevin Shirley – mixing
- Ryan Smith – mastering
- Yasufumi Soejima – director
- Hugh Syme – artwork, design
- Mika Tyyskä – director
