= The Majesty Demos =

- YtseJam Records re-release artwork

Demo album by Dream Theater
- Released: June 1, 1986; 2003 (YtseJam re-release); January 21, 2022 (InsideOut re-release)
- Recorded: 1985–1986
- Genres: Progressive rock, progressive metal
- Length: 37:18 (original release); 74:19 (YtseJam and InsideOut re-release)
- Labels: Independent (original release); YtseJam Records/InsideOut Music (re-releases)

Dream Theater chronology
The Majesty Demos (1986)	When Dream and Day Unite (1989)

Professional ratings
Review scores
Source	Rating
Allmusic	1/5 stars

The Majesty Demos is the first demo album by American progressive metal band Dream Theater, under their original name, Majesty. The original 1986 tape contained six tracks that were recorded on Mike Portnoy's analog 4-track recorder and another 4-track recorder obtained from friends at Berklee College of Music. All the band members were about 19 years old at the time of the recording. Only 1,000 copies were produced on cassette tape and distributed to fans and rock and metal magazines. Portnoy gave one copy to Jim Matheos of Fates Warning, a move that was instrumental in the band's entry into the progressive rock scene. The line-up on the initial recording was keyboardist Kevin Moore, bassist John Myung, guitarist John Petrucci, and drummer Mike Portnoy. Chris Collins, the band's singer at the time, had been introduced to the band after a friend heard a demo of him singing a note-for-note version of Queensrÿche's "Queen of the Reich".

Seventeen tracks were released by YtseJam Records under the title The Berklee Demos and were recorded earlier by Portnoy, Petrucci, and Myung at Berklee. These tracks are instrumental. Tracks 11–17 are seven guitar miniatures, recorded by Petrucci and Portnoy late one night to demonstrate double-tracking the guitar. The songs on The Berklee Demos do not include keyboards, except for the cover of Rush's "YYZ," on which Portnoy plays keyboards. These recordings include versions of "Another Won," "Two Far," and "Your Majesty," which would all later appear on The Majesty Demos, though originally they were instrumentals without keyboards. For this reason, these three songs appear twice on the YtseJam Records re-release, as the CD is a combination of The Berklee Demos and The Majesty Demos.

== Track listing ==
No.	Title	Writer(s)	Length
1.	"Another Won"	John Petrucci	5:27
2.	"Your Majesty"	Petrucci	3:45
3.	"A Vision"	Kevin Moore	11:24
4.	"Two Far"	Moore	5:25
5.	"Vital Star"	Moore	5:44
6.	"March of the Tyrant"	John Myung	5:34

=== YtseJam Records and InsideOut re-release track listing ===
No.	Title	Length
1.	"Particle E. Motion"	1:38
2.	"Another Won (instrumental version)"	5:26
3.	"The Saurus"	1:23
4.	"Cry for Freedom"	6:31
5.	"The School Song"	6:12
6.	"YYZ" (Rush cover)	4:03
7.	"The Farandole" (Talas cover)	3:16
8.	"Two Far (instrumental version)"	5:40
9.	"Anti-Procrastination Song" (S.O.D. cover)	0:13
10.	"Your Majesty (instrumental version)"	3:56
11.	"Solar System Race Song"	0:17
12.	"I'm About to Faint Song"	0:09
13.	"Mosquitos in Harmony Song"	0:12
14.	"John Thinks He's Randy Song"	0:10
15.	"Mike Thinks He's Dee Dee Ramone Introducing a Song Song"	0:16
16.	"John Thinks He's Yngwie Song"	0:15
17.	"Gnos Sdrawkcab"	0:23
18.	"Another Won"	5:27
19.	"Your Majesty"	3:45
20.	"A Vision"	11:24
21.	"Two Far"	5:25
22.	"Vital Star"	5:44
23.	"March of the Tyrant"	5:34

== Personnel ==
- Chris Collins – lead vocals on tracks 18–23
- Kevin Moore – keyboards on tracks 18–23
- John Myung – bass
- John Petrucci – guitars
- Mike Portnoy – drums; keyboards on track 6
