= Train of Thought (Dream Theater album) =

2003 studio album by Dream Theater

Studio album by Dream Theater
- Released: November 11, 2003
- Recorded: April – June and September 2003
- Studios: Cove City Sound Studios, Pie Studios and Beat Street Studios in New York City
- Genres: Progressive metal; heavy metal
- Length: 69:21
- Label: Elektra
- Producers: John Petrucci; Mike Portnoy

Dream Theater chronology
Six Degrees of Inner Turbulence (2002)	Train of Thought (2003)	Live at Budokan (2004)

Professional ratings
Review scores
Source	Rating
AllMusic	4.5/5 stars
IGN	8/10 stars
Louder Sound	3.5/5 stars
Metal Review	7.9 stars on a 10 point scale

Train of Thought is the seventh studio album by American progressive metal band Dream Theater, released on November 11, 2003 through Elektra Records.

Inspired by the audience response to Dream Theater's heavier songs while on tour, in the Chaos in Progress documentary, Portnoy says that they wanted Train of Thought to be a "balls to the wall" album with heavier, darker riffing, exposing them to a number of new metal fans. The album was written in three weeks. It was engineered by Doug Oberkircher and mixed by Kevin Shirley. Most of the album was played in concert for the Live at Budokan DVD. All songs from it have been played live to date.

== Writing ==
As mentioned in videos of the recording/writing sessions, which were filmed by Mike Portnoy, Dream Theater "cooped themselves in a rehearsal studio" in New York. The band wrote the full album from March 10 through April 3, in a record time of three weeks. After writing the album, Dream Theater began recording the album; the band started with the drum tracks and ended with the vocals.

== Songs ==
- The album opens with the same chord that closed the previous album, Six Degrees of Inner Turbulence. Similarly, the faint piano note that ends the album is heard at the beginning of the band's next album, Octavarium.
- Some lyrics of "As I Am" were inspired by Dream Theater's 2003 summer tour with Queensrÿche, described by Mike Portnoy as an "irksome series of shows." According to Portnoy, Queensrÿche guitarist Mike Stone tried giving John Petrucci tips on playing guitar, leading Petrucci to write the lyrics: "Don't tell me what's in, tell me how to write".
- "This Dying Soul" continues Mike Portnoy's Twelve-step Suite, which started with "The Glass Prison" on Six Degrees of Inner Turbulence and later continued with "The Root of All Evil" on Octavarium, "Repentance" on Systematic Chaos, and concluded with "The Shattered Fortress" on Black Clouds & Silver Linings. These songs share some of the lyrics and melodies. For example, this song features a riff from "The Glass Prison", which is heard at the start of this song's step "Release".
- "Honor Thy Father" was written about Mike Portnoy's stepfather. When asked about what inspired him to write that song, he stated in an IRC: "I'm not very good at writing love songs, so I decided to write a hate song!"
- Some of the samples in the instrumental break "Honor Thy Father" are taken from Paul Thomas Anderson's film Magnolia, in the scene when Jason Robards' character is talking to Philip Seymour Hoffman's character about his regrets in life. There are also parts taken from the film At Close Range in which a scene of Sean Penn and Christopher Walken's characters can be heard arguing. Other voice samples heard during the bridge were taken from the movies Ordinary People and The Royal Tenenbaums as well as the TV series Oz.
- The lyrics to "Vacant" were inspired by James LaBrie's daughter, who fell into a short coma after suffering a sudden, unexplained seizure three days before her seventh birthday.
- "Stream of Consciousness" is the longest instrumental on a Dream Theater studio album to date and was the intended title for Falling Into Infinity.
- Between 5:51 and 6:07 of the song "In the Name of God", there was a hidden composition buried beneath the far louder sounds of the song itself which lay undiscovered for over a year and a half. The band did not tell anyone that a hidden "nugget" (as it became known amongst Dream Theater fans) was present in the song, and only when Mike Portnoy mentioned it in his Mike Portnoy: Live at Budokan Drum-Cam DVD over a year later did someone find it. The Mike Portnoy message board was rife with fans scouring the song looking for what it might be, until a fan going by the pseudonymous name "DarrylRevok" mentioned that from 5:51 to 6:07 there appeared to be morse code audible, which Nick Bogovich (user handle "Bogie") isolated and discovered that when translated to English, the phrase "eat my ass and balls" (a Mike Portnoy catchphrase) was the result.
- From 12:56 onwards of "In the Name of God", the American Civil War hymn "The Battle Hymn of the Republic" can be heard in the right channel.
- Jordan Rudess played the final note in the album (heard at 14:06 of "In the Name of God") with his nose as shown in the "Making Train of Thought" documentary. Mike Portnoy approved the take while he was filming.

== Track listing ==
All music composed by John Myung, John Petrucci, Mike Portnoy and Jordan Rudess except where noted (per album liner notes).

No.	Title	Lyrics	Length
1.	"As I Am"	Petrucci	7:47
2.	"This Dying Soul": "IV. Reflections of Reality (Revisited)"; "V. Release"	Portnoy	11:27
3.	"Endless Sacrifice"	Petrucci	11:24
4.	"Honor Thy Father"	Portnoy	10:14
5.	"Vacant" (music: Myung, Rudess)	James LaBrie	2:57
6.	"Stream of Consciousness"	(instrumental)	11:16
7.	"In the Name of God"	Petrucci	14:16
Total length:			69:21

Selections from Live Scenes from New York (Korean Special Edition bonus disc)
No.	Title	Lyrics	Length
1.	"Overture 1928"	(instrumental)	3:36
2.	"Strange Déjà Vu"	Portnoy	5:04
3.	"Home"	Portnoy	13:34
4.	"The Spirit Carries On"	Petrucci	7:41
5.	"Just Let Me Breathe"	Portnoy	4:03
6.	"Acid Rain" (music: Tony Levin, Petrucci, Portnoy, Rudess)	(instrumental)	2:35
7.	"Caught In a New Millennium"	LaBrie, Petrucci, Portnoy	6:01
Total length:			42:31

- The Korean special edition included songs from the Live Scenes from New York live collection.

== Personnel ==
Dream Theater

- James LaBrie – lead vocals
- John Myung – bass
- John Petrucci – guitars
- Mike Portnoy – drums
- Jordan Rudess – keyboards

Additional personnel

- Eugene Friesen – cello on "Vacant"

Production

- John Petrucci, Mike Portnoy – production
- Doug Oberkircher – engineering
- Kevin Shirley – mixing
- Kieran Pardias, Brian Harding – assistant recording engineers
- Yohei Goto – assistant additional recording engineer
- Dan Buchi – assistant mixing engineer
- Howie Weinberg – mastering
- Roger Lian – digital editing
- Jerry Uelsmann – artwork, photography
- Anita Marisa Boriboon – art direction

== Chart performance ==
Chart (2002–2003)	Peak position
Austrian Albums (Ö3 Austria)	66
Belgian Albums (Ultratop Wallonia)	76
Dutch Albums (Album Top 100)	21
Finnish Albums (Suomen virallinen lista)	9
French Albums (SNEP)	24
German Albums (Offizielle Top 100)	16
Greek Albums (IFPI)	1
Hungarian Albums (MAHASZ)	25
Italian Albums (FIMI)	11
Norwegian Albums (VG-lista)	9
Portuguese Albums (AFP)	21
Swedish Albums (Sverigetopplistan)	9
Swiss Albums (Schweizer Hitparade)	44
US Billboard 200	53

- Billboard Top Internet Albums: 53
