= Octavarium =

2005 studio album by Dream Theater

Studio album by Dream Theater
- Released: June 7, 2005
- Recorded: November 2004 – February 2005
- Studio: The Hit Factory, New York City
- Genre: Progressive rock; progressive metal
- Length: 75:44
- Label: Atlantic
- Producer: John Petrucci; Mike Portnoy

Dream Theater chronology
Live at Budokan (2004)	Octavarium (2005)	Score (2006)

Octavarium is the eighth studio album by American progressive metal band Dream Theater. Released on June 7, 2005, it was the band's final release with Atlantic Records. Recorded between September 2004 and February 2005, it was the last album recorded at The Hit Factory in New York City. With it, the band decided to create "a classic Dream Theater album", drawing upon their various stylistic influences while trying to make the music less complex. The album takes its creative concept from the musical octave.

Octavarium peaked in the top five in the Finnish, Italian, and Swedish charts, and in the top ten in the Dutch, Japanese, and Norwegian charts. Critical reception of the album was generally positive; the diversity of the music was praised, although critics found some of the songwriting to be inconsistent. Dream Theater promoted the album on a year-long world tour, with the majority of concerts lasting almost three hours and featuring a different set list each night. The tour finished at Radio City Music Hall accompanied by an orchestra; this performance was recorded and released as a live album and concert video entitled Score. They co-headlined the 2005 North American Gigantour with Megadeth.

== Background ==
After completing a North American tour supporting one of their main influences, Yes, in summer 2004, Dream Theater took a two-month break. The band reconvened at The Hit Factory in New York City in November 2004 to begin work on their eighth studio album.

After writing the concept album Metropolis Pt. 2: Scenes from a Memory, the double album Six Degrees of Inner Turbulence and the metal-focused Train of Thought, the band decided to create "a classic Dream Theater album". Keyboardist Jordan Rudess described it as "really going back to creating a real band effort, as well as drawing upon all our various stylistic influences." On Octavarium, the band wanted to make the music less complex, featuring songs which Rudess regards as "quicker to appreciate", although noted that the twenty-four-minute "Octavarium" was not as accessible. Guitarist John Petrucci noted that they wanted to focus on writing strong songs. To achieve this, the band stripped the sound down to piano, guitar and vocals when writing, focusing on the melodies and song structures.

Drummer Mike Portnoy dismissed claims that Octavarium was an attempt to write a more commercial album, stating that the band simply "[has] that side to [them]. We love bands like U2 or Coldplay, as well as liking shorter songs." Portnoy noted that, after writing Six Degrees of Inner Turbulence and Train of Thought, they had not written an album of shorter songs for some time. He said that the band had found writing longer songs easier than writing shorter ones, and that the band was not trying to write a radio hit as "the label wouldn't have done crap with it anyway."

The band had previously written an orchestral-style piece in the form of "Overture" on Six Degrees of Inner Turbulence, but Jordan Rudess recorded these using two keyboards: his Kurzweil K2600 and Korg KARMA, the latter a then-new synthesizer that Rudess had bought fairly recently. The tracks "The Answer Lies Within", "Sacrificed Sons" and "Octavarium" marked the first time Dream Theater worked with an orchestra, conducted by Jamshied Sharifi (who later conducted the Octavarium Orchestra on Dream Theater's 2006 live album Score). The orchestra was selected based on their sight reading ability, allowing all their parts to be recorded in a maximum of two takes, even though they had never seen or played the music before.

== Concept ==
When starting to work on what would become Octavarium, Portnoy noted that it would be their eighth studio album and that they had recently released their fifth live album, Live at Budokan. This sequence mirrored the octave on a musical keyboard: each octave contains eight naturals and five accidentals. Portnoy suggested that they use that concept for the entire album. When writing, the band delegated each song a different key. Sound effects were placed between songs to connect them: for example, "The Root of All Evil", written in F minor, and the following track, "The Answer Lies Within", written in G minor, were connected by a sound effect in the key of F♯ minor. The album's lyrics and song titles featured references to this concept. Portnoy cited the titles "The Root of all Evil" (referring to the musical term "root") and "Octavarium" ("the octave of the octave") as two examples of this.

Length	Track	Key
00:00–08:07	The Root of All Evil	F
08:08–08:25	Nature Sounds (negative time in CD: −00:18)	F♯/G♭
00:00–05:26	The Answer Lies Within	G
05:27–05:33	Pitch Bend (negative time in CD: −00:07)	G♯/A♭
00:00–06:59	These Walls	A
07:00–07:36	Wind/Heartbeat/Chimes (negative time in CD: −00:37)	A♯/B♭
00:00–04:29	I Walk Beside You	B
00:00–07:16	Panic Attack	C
07:17–08:13	Synth Solo (negative time in CD: −00:57)	C♯/D♭
00:00–06:33	Never Enough	D
06:34–06:46	Voices Begin (negative time in CD: −00:13)	D♯/E♭
00:00–10:42	Sacrificed Sons	E
00:00–24:00	Octavarium	F (octave)

Octavarium begins "The Root of All Evil" with the final note of the band's previous album, Train of Thought with "In the Name of God". Train of Thought started "As I Am" with the last note from Six Degrees of Inner Turbulence with the title track, which in turn started with the noise that ended Scenes from a Memory at the end of "Finally Free". Portnoy was inspired to do this thanks to the Van Halen album Women and Children First; the outro of the album's final song ended with a new riff being played which faded out. Portnoy recalled that he expected Van Halen's next album to start with that ending riff, but was disappointed when it did not. He later realized he had "dug a hole where we're expected to do it every time". He solved this problem on Octavarium, where the final track ends with the beginning of the first one. This made the album a cycle in itself, allowing the band to have a clean start with their next album. At 04:52–05:17 is a lyrical and musical reference to the chorus of "This Dying Soul" from Train of Thought. This reference comes from Portnoy's Twelve-step Suite. All of the negative-time sections on the CD version were omitted on the digital versions initially, but later made available.

=== Content ===
"The Root of All Evil" is the third part of Portnoy's Twelve-step Suite, a set of songs from various Dream Theater albums which describe his journey through Alcoholics Anonymous. The song contains parts six and seven of the suite: "Ready" and "Remove". "The Answer Lies Within" and "I Walk Beside You" are the two shortest tracks on the album. Rudess regards them as radio-friendly songs which still maintain Dream Theater's style.

Portnoy wrote the lyrics to "Never Enough" as a response to fans who Portnoy perceived to complain about everything that Dream Theater did. Portnoy stated that while he appreciated the devotion of Dream Theater's fans, he was frustrated because he was "constantly tearing [himself] away from [his] family" to give more to the fans. He found it discouraging that, even though he spent "countless nights" writing special set lists and the band spent days rehearsing, some fans still complained that they went to a show and did not hear "Pull Me Under". "It's discouraging and makes me crazy sometimes," he said.

"Sacrificed Sons", at almost eleven minutes long, is the second-longest song on the album. Its lyrics, written by vocalist James LaBrie, deal with the September 11 attacks. Rudess noted that the band enjoyed writing about more serious topics instead of love songs. When working on the lyrics, LaBrie said that there was "a lot of discussion" about the song's wording and how direct it should be.

The title track, "Octavarium", is the longest track on the album, at 24:00, and is divided into five parts. Petrucci stated that the band wanted to write an epic song that thematically developed and used an orchestra. The band was heavily influenced by the progressive rock sound of Genesis, Yes and Pink Floyd. The instrumental introduction, heavily influenced by Pink Floyd's "Shine On You Crazy Diamond", was performed by Rudess using a lap steel guitar and Continuum. Additionally, the lyrics include many references to other progressive rock songs. The song ends with the introductory theme of "The Root of All Evil" before fading out. (Some releases contain an alternative version, with the reprise flute from the first part of "Octavarium" playing in the background.) The ending establishes a cyclical theme to the album, and breaks the continuity of the meta-album established since Scenes from a Memory, allowing the band the opportunity for a fresh start on the next album.

=== Artwork ===
Hugh Syme provided the artwork for Octavarium. The idea of depicting a giant Newton's cradle was born out of discussions between Syme and Portnoy about how "for everything you do in music you create either a cluster or triad", according to Syme. "And then it became evident that for every action there is an opposite reaction. So I thought we could do something based on the Newton's cradle." The artwork contains numerous references to the numbers five and eight, alluding to the album's concept. For example, the Newton's cradle has eight suspended balls, and there are five birds on the cover. The album booklet features an octagonal maze, spider and octopus, among other references. The landscape on the cover is made up of a sky and grass from Indiana, and a background from the Lake District. Octavarium began an extended association with the band for Syme. He provided the artwork for all the following studio albums (apart from The Astonishing) and most of the following live releases.

== Release ==
A week before the scheduled release of Octavarium, Portnoy shut down the official Dream Theater and Mike Portnoy forums. Blabbermouth.net reported that this was in response to the album being leaked. Portnoy stated that "[he] chose to do this mainly [emphasis removed] to build anticipation for the big 'official' unveiling next week", although noted that "the repeated requests to refrain from spoilers and links for the new album against the band's wishes were frustrating".

Octavarium was released on June 7, 2005. It was their final album with Atlantic Records, ending a contract which had lasted fourteen years. Although in recent years the band had been allowed creative freedom, they were dissatisfied by the lack of promotion the label offered them. Portnoy released a DVD entitled Drumavarium in 2005, containing footage of his drum performance from the Octavarium recording sessions. Rudess released a solo piano version of "The Answer Lies Within" on his 2009 album Notes on a Dream. "Panic Attack" is featured as a playable song in Rock Band 2, where it is listed as the hardest song for both bass and drums.

=== Reception ===
Professional ratings
Review scores
Source	Rating
AllMusic	3.5/5 stars
Billboard	Favorable
Blistering	Favorable
Exclaim!	Negative
The Metal Forge	9/10 stars
MetalReview.com	7.9 stars on a 10 point scale
musicOMH	Favorable

Octavarium reached the top five in the Finnish, Italian, and Swedish charts, as well as the top ten in the Dutch, Japanese, and Norwegian charts. Critical reception of the album was generally positive. Writing for Blistering, Justin Donnelly praised the album as "diverse, melodic and hard hitting all at the same time", ranking it as one of Dream Theater's best releases. He particularly praised the title track, considering it to be "another Dream Theater classic". Billboard considered the results of the band's attempt to write shorter songs and use warmer instrumental textures to be "excellent", particularly praising "The Root of All Evil", "These Walls" and "I Walk Beside You".

Harley Carlson of MetalReview.com regarded Octavarium as "successfully [showcasing] the band's ability to craft emotive music," although noted that it is "unquestionably Dream Theater, yet there is something missing." Vik Bansal of musicOMH praised "Never Enough", "Panic Attack" and "Sacrificed Sons", but dismissed "The Root of All Evil" as "Dream Theater by the numbers". He criticized "Octavarium" as "bloated", although noted that fans of the band's A Change of Seasons would enjoy it. He said that "there's enough on the remainder of Octavarium to keep the rest of us interested and the prog rock haters whining dismissively". Writing for Exclaim!, Greg Pratt praised the album's artwork and production, but said that "there’s nothing that blows any minds here, or even gives a mild bend; hell, a good chunk of this disc feels like basic radio rock from the local old-guy bar band". He noted that although there were some longer songs on the album, "this just feels like 76 minutes of overdramatic rock, too heavy on the light and weak, and not enough time spent on just showing off".

Donnelly considered Octavarium to be "somewhere between Images and Words, Six Degrees of Inner Turbulence and Train of Thought". Carlson stated that the album "draws closest comparison to Falling into Infinity and Metropolis II: Scenes from a Memory, but with far less complexity and edge." Tammy La Gorce of AllMusic noted that "a post-hardcore edge - call it a leap into 2005 - has invaded [the band's] pledge of allegiance to theatrical heavy rock... What's changed is Dream Theater's commitment to carrying on their reputation as underground progressive rock's classicists, and it seems well-timed." Critics noted a strong Muse influence on some tracks, in some cases generating negative reviews.

== Touring ==
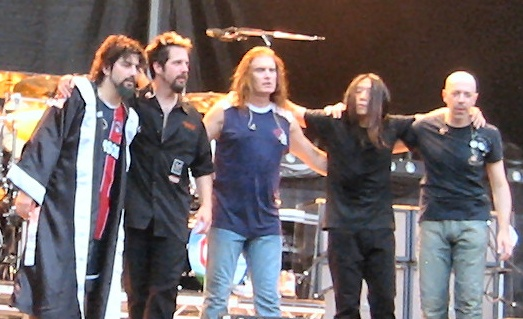
Dream Theater after a concert in Paris during the first European leg of their tour (2005). From left to right: Mike Portnoy, John Petrucci, James LaBrie, John Myung and Jordan Rudess

Dream Theater began the Octavarium Tour in support of Octavarium in Europe on June 10, 2005, beginning at the Sweden Rock Festival in Sölvesborg. The band co-headlined the Gigantour with Megadeth across North America from July 21 to September 3. The Montreal concert was recorded and released as a live album and concert video on August 22, 2006, and September 5, 2006, respectively, titled Gigantour. The main Octavarium world tour began in September in Finland, and continued the band's "An Evening With Dream Theater" concert format. This meant the band would play for almost three hours, with a different set list each evening. Many of the shows centered on a tour of the band's history to that point, featuring a song (or part of a longer song) for each album before wrapping up the regular set with several from Octavarium. Combined with interviews, rehearsals during soundcheck and meet-and-greet sessions with fans, the band became physically and mentally drained.

Dream Theater performed two shows on consecutive nights in both Amsterdam and London. On the second night in both cities, the band covered the entirety of Pink Floyd's The Dark Side of the Moon album. Theresa Thomason, who had previously performed on Scenes From a Memory, was flown in to perform vocals on "The Great Gig in the Sky". The London performance was released as a live album and concert video in 2006 by Portnoy's YtseJam Records. The band covered all of Deep Purple's Made in Japan at concerts in Tokyo and Osaka, a recording of which was released as a live album by YtseJam Records in 2007.

To celebrate the band's twentieth anniversary, the final concert on the tour was performed at Radio City Music Hall in New York on April 1, 2006. For the second half of the concert, the band was accompanied by a thirty-piece orchestra conducted by Jamshied Sharifi. The concert was filmed and released as a live album and concert video named Score on August 29, 2006, by Rhino Records.

== Track listing ==
All music is composed by Dream Theater.

No.	Title	Lyrics	Length
1.	"The Root of All Evil": "VI. Ready"; "VII. Remove"	Mike Portnoy	8:25
2.	"The Answer Lies Within"	John Petrucci	5:33
3.	"These Walls"	Petrucci	7:36
4.	"I Walk Beside You"	Petrucci	4:29
5.	"Panic Attack"	Petrucci	8:13
6.	"Never Enough"	Portnoy	6:46
7.	"Sacrificed Sons"	James LaBrie	10:42
8.	"Octavarium": "I. Someone Like Him"; "II. Medicate (Awakening)"; "III. Full Circle"; "IV. Intervals"; "V. Razor's Edge"	LaBrie, Petrucci, Portnoy: Petrucci; LaBrie; Portnoy; Portnoy; Petrucci	24:00
Total length:			75:44

== Personnel ==
Dream Theater

- James LaBrie – lead vocals
- John Myung – bass
- John Petrucci – guitars, backing vocals, producer
- Mike Portnoy – drums, percussion, backing vocals, producer, art concept
- Jordan Rudess – keyboards, Continuum, lap steel guitar

Additional personnel

- Orchestra on "Sacrificed Sons" and "Octavarium"
  - Elena Barere – concertmaster
  - Katherine Fong, Ann Lehmann, Katherine Livolsi-Stern, Laura McGinniss, Catherine Ro, Ricky Sortomme, Yuri Vodovoz – violins
  - Vincent Lionti, Karen Dreyfus – violas
  - Richard Locker, Jeanne LeBlanc – celli
  - Pamela Sklar – flute
  - Joe Anderer, Stewart Rose – French horns
- String quartet on "The Answer Lies Within"
  - Elena Barere – first violin
  - Carol Webb – second violin
  - Vincent Lionti – viola
  - Richard Locker – cello
- Jamshied Sharifi – strings arrangement, conductor
- Jill Dell'Abate – orchestral contractor

Technical personnel

- Doug Oberkircher – engineer
- Colleen Culhane, Kaori Kinoshita, Ryan Simms – assistant engineers
- Bert Baldwin – additional studio assistance
- Michael H. Brauer – mixing
- Keith Gary – assistant and Pro Tools engineer
- Will Hensley – second assistant
- George Marino – mastering
- Hugh Syme – art direction, design, illustration, art concept
- Colin Lane – photography

== Chart positions ==
Chart (2005)	Peak position
Austrian Albums (Ö3 Austria)	35
Belgian Albums (Ultratop Flanders)	48
Belgian Albums (Ultratop Wallonia)	70
Canadian Albums (Billboard)	15
Danish Albums (Hitlisten)	38
Dutch Albums (Album Top 100)	9
Finnish Albums (Suomen virallinen lista)	2
French Albums (SNEP)	18
German Albums (Offizielle Top 100)	15
Hungarian Albums (MAHASZ)	4
Italian Albums (FIMI)	2
Japanese Albums (Oricon)	10
Norwegian Albums (VG-lista)	9
Polish Albums (ZPAV)	8
Portuguese Albums (AFP)	15
Spanish Albums (Promusicae)	31
Swedish Albums (Sverigetopplistan)	4
Swiss Albums (Schweizer Hitparade)	25
UK Albums (OCC)	72
US Billboard 200	36
