= Six Degrees of Inner Turbulence =

2002 studio album by Dream Theater

Studio album by Dream Theater
- Released: January 29, 2002
- Recorded: March–September 2001
- Studios: BearTracks Studios, Suffern, New York
- Genres: Progressive metal; progressive rock
- Length: 96:20
- Label: Elektra
- Producers: John Petrucci; Mike Portnoy

Dream Theater chronology
Live Scenes from New York (2001)	Six Degrees of Inner Turbulence (2002)	Train of Thought (2003)

Professional ratings
Review scores
Source	Rating
AllMusic	4/5 stars
Entertainment Weekly	(B)
Rolling Stone	(favorable)
411mania.com	8.5/10 stars

Six Degrees of Inner Turbulence is the sixth studio album by American progressive metal band Dream Theater, released as a double-disc album on January 29, 2002, through Elektra Records. It is the first full-length Dream Theater album to feature a title track. It is also their second longest studio album to date, after The Astonishing (2016).

== Songs ==
- The first track of the album, "The Glass Prison", is the beginning of the Twelve-step Suite, dealing with Mike Portnoy's story of rehabilitation from alcoholism, continued in tracks on subsequent albums ("This Dying Soul" on Train of Thought, "The Root of All Evil" on Octavarium, "Repentance" on Systematic Chaos and "The Shattered Fortress" on Black Clouds & Silver Linings). "The Glass Prison" is composed of three parts, mirroring the first three of the twelve steps of the AA program for rehabilitation of alcoholics. Furthermore, the track begins with the same static phonograph noise that ended "Finally Free" on Metropolis Pt. 2: Scenes from a Memory (1999).
- "Blind Faith" features lyrics written by James LaBrie about questioning religious belief. It is the second longest song for which LaBrie has contributed lyrics to date, the longest being "Sacrificed Sons" from Octavarium. It was also the first time he had written lyrics for more than one song on an album. The next time would also be on Octavarium.
- In the song "Misunderstood", John Petrucci wrote and played the guitar solo, and then reversed it. He then learned how to play this reversed version, and he tries to mimic the reversed version live with effects. This track is in its shorter radio edit form on the cassette edition.
- "The Great Debate" is intended to be a non-partisan song dealing with the topic of stem-cell research. It was originally titled "Conflict at Ground Zero" based on the lyrics in the chorus but was changed at the last minute as news reports started to refer to the site of the 9/11 terrorist attack in New York City as "Ground Zero". The band was actually in a Manhattan studio conducting final mixes of the album on the day in question.
- Lyrics for the song "Disappear" were written by James LaBrie about the subject of death; it was originally titled "Move On". This track is omitted entirely from the cassette edition.
- The sixth song, "Six Degrees of Inner Turbulence", which makes up the entire second CD (albeit split into eight separate tracks), is the longest song Dream Theater have recorded to date. While recording, they wanted to keep the song at 20 minutes, but more and more ideas came which resulted in the length doubling. Realizing that they would have to cut "Disappear" and "Misunderstood" to keep the album at one CD, their record label was now open for the idea of a double album, something the band had previously been denied when recording Images and Words and Falling into Infinity. Despite this, the cassette edition reduced "Misunderstood" to its radio edit version and omitted "Disappear" entirely.
- The last chord of "Six Degrees of Inner Turbulence" is used to open "As I Am" on the next album Train of Thought, continuing a chain which ended with Octavarium.

== Influences ==
Influences for the album's writing and recording, according to the authors, include:

- U2, Achtung Baby
- Alice in Chains, Dirt
- Béla Bartók
- Galactic Cowboys, Space in Your Face
- Kevin Gilbert,Thud
- King's X, Faith Hope Love
- Maria Tipo, Chopin Nocturnes.
- Megadeth, Rust in Peace
- Metallica, Master of Puppets
- Nine Inch Nails, The Downward Spiral
- Pantera, Far Beyond Driven
  - (and the song "Mouth for War")
- Radiohead, OK Computer
  - (and also a Radiohead bootleg Portnoy brought in)
- Rage Against the Machine, The Battle of Los Angeles
- Soundgarden, Superunknown
- Tool's Ænima

== Track listing ==
=== Disc one ===
All music is composed by John Myung, John Petrucci, Mike Portnoy and Jordan Rudess, per the album liner notes.

No.	Title	Lyrics	Length
1.	"The Glass Prison": "I. Reflection"; "II. Restoration"; "III. Revelation"	Portnoy	13:52
2.	"Blind Faith"	James LaBrie	10:21
3.	"Misunderstood"	Petrucci	9:32
4.	"The Great Debate"	Petrucci	13:46
5.	"Disappear"	LaBrie	6:46
Total length:			54:18

=== Disc two ===
"Six Degrees of Inner Turbulence"
No.	Title	Lyrics	Length
1.	"I. Overture"	(instrumental)	6:50
2.	"II. About to Crash"	Petrucci	5:50
3.	"III. War Inside My Head"	Portnoy	2:08
4.	"IV. The Test That Stumped Them All"	Portnoy	5:03
5.	"V. Goodnight Kiss"	Portnoy	6:17
6.	"VI. Solitary Shell"	Petrucci	5:47
7.	"VII. About to Crash (Reprise)"	Petrucci	4:04
8.	"VIII. Losing Time/Grand Finale"	Petrucci	5:59
Total length:			42:02

== Personnel ==
Dream Theater

- James LaBrie – lead vocals
- John Myung – bass
- John Petrucci – guitars, backing vocals, production
- Mike Portnoy – drums, percussion, backing vocals, co-lead vocals (on "The Glass Prison" and "War Inside My Head"), production
- Jordan Rudess – keyboards

Additional personnel

- Howard Portnoy – gong drum (on "The Great Debate")

Production

- Doug Oberkircher − engineering
- J.P. Sheganowski – engineering assistance
- Kevin Shirley – mixing
- Claudius Mittendorfer – mixing assistance
- George Marino – mastering
- Eugene "UE" Natasi – mastering assistance
- Dung Hoang – cover art illustration
- Ken Schles – photography
- May Redding – stylist (photography)
- JMatic – art direction

== Charts ==
Chart (2002)	Peak position
Austrian Albums (Ö3 Austria)	73
Belgian Albums (Ultratop Flanders)	35
Danish Albums (Hitlisten)	33
Dutch Albums (Album Top 100)	14
Finnish Albums (Suomen virallinen lista)	2
French Albums (SNEP)	17
German Albums (Offizielle Top 100)	12
Hungarian Albums (MAHASZ)	7
Italian Albums (FIMI)	5
Japanese Albums (Oricon)	15
Norwegian Albums (VG-lista)	16
Swedish Albums (Sverigetopplistan)	12
Swiss Albums (Schweizer Hitparade)	52
UK Rock & Metal Albums (Official Charts)	29
US Billboard 200	46
