= Six Degrees of Inner Turbulence (song) =

Song by Dream Theater

from the album Six Degrees of Inner Turbulence
- Released: 2002
- Genre: Progressive metal, Progressive rock
- Length: 42:00
- Label: Elektra Records
- Composers: John Petrucci; John Myung; Mike Portnoy; Jordan Rudess
- Lyricists: John Petrucci; Mike Portnoy
- Producers: Mike Portnoy; John Petrucci

"Six Degrees of Inner Turbulence" is the sixth song and title track on the album of the same name, written and performed by American progressive metal band Dream Theater. Though the song is essentially broken up into eight movements on separate tracks, it lasts 42 minutes in full and takes up the entire second CD of the album. The song was conceived when keyboardist Jordan Rudess wrote what would become the "Overture" section, and the band took various melodies and ideas contained within it and expanded them into segments of the complete piece. The song explores the stories of six individuals suffering from various mental conditions. Particularly represented are bipolar disorder, post-traumatic stress disorder, schizophrenia, post-partum depression, autism, and dissociative identity disorder.

Clocking in at 42 minutes, it is the longest song Dream Theater has recorded; to ease scrolling through the song, Mike Portnoy gave each movement their own track, and split the full song into eight tracks.

The song was played in its entirety on Score, with the "Octavarium Orchestra" playing "Overture" and backing for the rest of the piece.

== Sections ==
There are eight sections:

1. "Overture" – 6:50 (instrumental)
2. "About to Crash" – 5:50 (Petrucci) – bipolar disorder
3. "War Inside My Head" – 2:08 (Portnoy) – post-traumatic stress disorder
4. "The Test That Stumped Them All" – 5:03 (Portnoy) – schizophrenia
5. "Goodnight Kiss" – 6:17 (Portnoy) – post-partum depression
6. "Solitary Shell" – 5:47 (Petrucci) – autism
7. "About to Crash (Reprise)" – 4:04 (Petrucci) – bipolar disorder
8. "Losing Time/Grand Finale" – 5:59 (Petrucci) – dissociative identity disorder

== Personnel ==
- James LaBrie – lead vocals
- John Petrucci – guitar, backing vocals
- John Myung – bass
- Jordan Rudess – keyboards
- Mike Portnoy – drums, backing vocals, co-lead vocals on "War Inside My Head"
