= John Myung =

American bassist

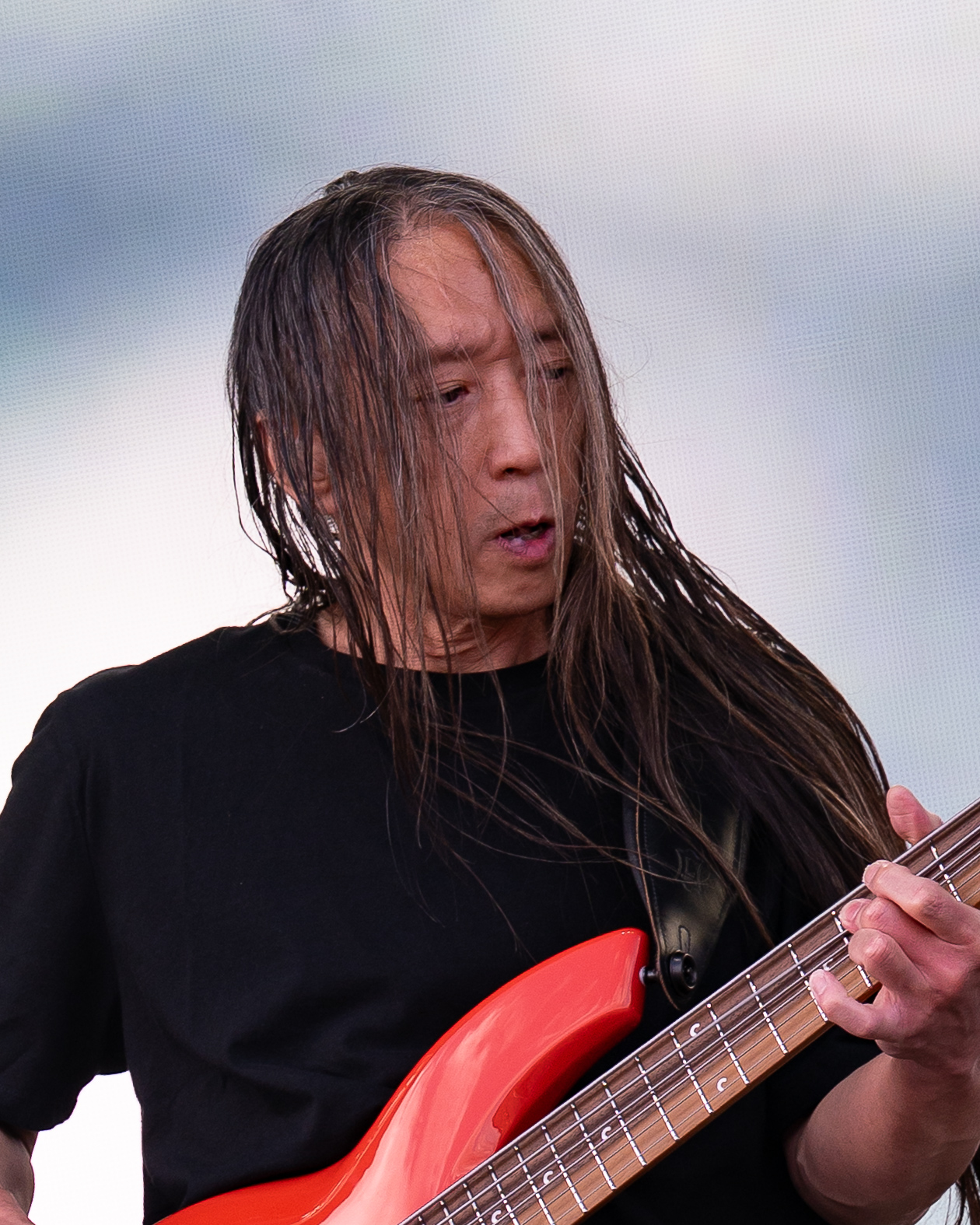
- Myung performing with Dream Theater in 2025

Background information
- Born: John Ro Myung; January 24, 1967 (age 59); Chicago, Illinois, U.S.
- Origin: Kings Park, New York, U.S.
- Genres: Progressive metal, progressive rock
- Occupation: Bassist
- Years active: 1984–present
- Member of: Dream Theater, the Jelly Jam
- Formerly of: Platypus, Explorers Club, Gordian Knot, Nicky Lemmons and the Migrane Brothers

John Ro Myung (/ˈmaɪ.əŋ/ MY-əng; born January 24, 1967) is an American bassist and a founding member of the progressive metal band Dream Theater.

== Background and personal life ==
Born in Chicago to South Korean parents, Myung grew up with John Petrucci on Long Island. He took violin lessons from the age of five and started playing bass guitar at fifteen. After graduating from high school, he and Petrucci enrolled at the Berklee College of Music, where they met Mike Portnoy. The trio became the nucleus of Dream Theater, which became Myung's primary professional focus.

== Style ==
Myung mainly uses a two or three finger picking style in his playing. He sometimes uses slapping and popping on some songs, such as "The Dark Eternal Night", and also uses tapping and harmonics in his bass playing. Myung's use of harmonics is frequently accompanied by a chorus effect, as in the opening of "Lifting Shadows off a Dream". The songs "These Walls" and "The Dark Eternal Night" feature Myung using a pick. Myung uses both tapping and fingerstyle to play the Chapman Stick.

Myung's favorite bands include the Beatles, Black Sabbath, the Who, Iron Maiden, Rush, Yes, Jethro Tull and Genesis. He cites bassists Geezer Butler, John Entwistle, Chris Squire, Steve Harris, Geddy Lee and Jaco Pastorius as main influences on his playing style.

Myung is known for his rigorous practicing schedule; producer Kevin Shirley and keyboardist Derek Sherinian have said that Myung is the only musician they know who "warms down" after a show. Petrucci has said that when he and Myung were in high school, they had an agreement to practice at least six hours every day.

Dream Theater's group writing process makes it difficult to identify which member of the band authored a particular song or song section, but on DVD commentaries, the band members have sometimes identified certain parts as "a John Myung riff," such as parts of "Fatal Tragedy" and the introduction to "The Glass Prison". Myung wrote the lyrics to one song per album from Images and Words to Metropolis Pt. 2: Scenes from a Memory, but thereafter did not contribute any lyrics until A Dramatic Turn of Events and since contributing lyrics to every subsequent album barring The Astonishing and Parasomnia. Portnoy has claimed that this was because Myung's lyrics usually needed some work by the rest of the band to fit the song. As a result, the band eventually imposed an unwritten lyric rule that required lyrics to be "properly formed, phrased, constructed, etc. to go with the melodies," and, "since then, John has kind of backed off."

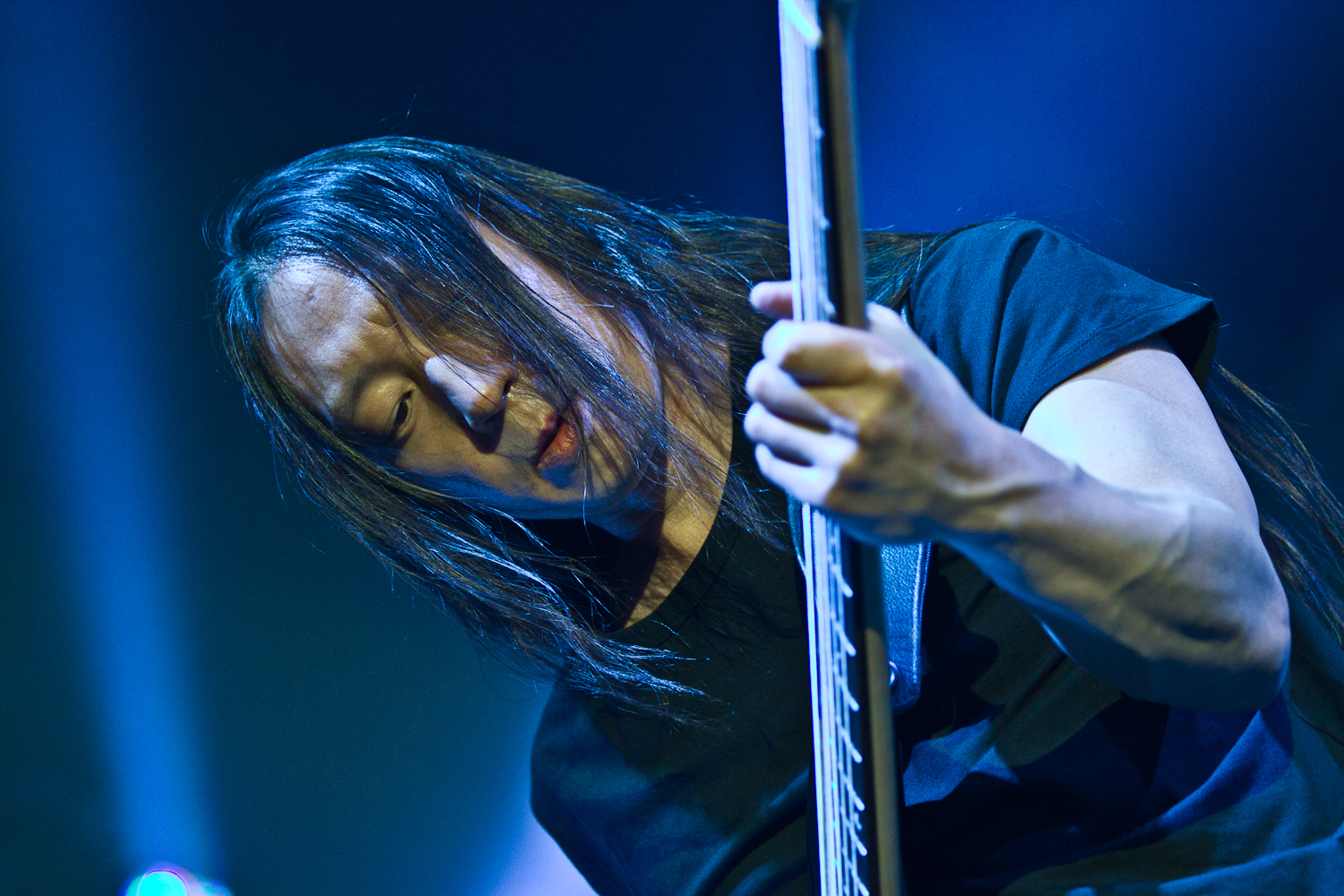
Myung at Mitsubishi Electric Hall Düsseldorf in 2014

== Instruments ==
=== Early Dream Theater gear ===
For When Dream and Day Unite, Dream Theater's debut, Myung played a modified Music Man StingRay four-string bass and a Fender Jazz Bass. The StingRay (his main live instrument in that period) was customized with an added front pickup driving a clean bass amp, while the bridge pickup signal was sent to his effects chain. A four-string Spector NS-2 was used for tracking 1992's Images and Words.

=== Switch to six-string basses ===
Myung switched to six-string basses for Dream Theater's subsequent tours, using several high-end Tobias "Basic" models. These can be seen in videos from Images and Words and heard on Live at the Marquee. He has primarily used six-string basses ever since.

For the Awake album and tours, Myung used basses produced by a small company formed by former Tobias luthier Nicholas Tung. Myung owned at least three of the only 100 instruments constructed, two "Wingbass II Bolt-on" six-strings (one Natural and one Sunburst), and one "Wingbass II Hybrid (a "half neck-through"). The natural-finish Wingbass II was his main live instrument in this period, and all three appear in his "Progressive Bass Concepts" instructional video.

=== Switch to Yamaha ===
After Tung ceased production, Myung began endorsing Yamaha instruments, using its TRB and John Patitucci six-string fretted and fretless basses live while working with Yamaha's Artist Custom Shop on what would become his signature instrument. Prototypes of the RBX6JM along with his TRB basses were used for the recording of 1997's Falling into Infinity. A bolt-on bass with alder body with flame-maple top, 35" scale, and "Infinity" dot inlay on the fretboard, various Red and Blue RBX6JM models were thereafter his main studio and live instruments until 2002, although he experimented with a Hamer 8-string bass and Music Man StingRay five-string while recording Six Degrees of Inner Turbulence.

In 2002, Myung and Yamaha unveiled the RBX-JM2, an updated version of his signature bass that echoed the redesign of Yamaha's entire RBX-series of basses. A 34" scale was used instead of the 35" scale used on the RBX6JM had, and a single Seymour Duncan Music Man-type humbucking pickup was used, influenced by Myung's use of the StingRay on Six Degrees of Inner Turbulence. (Myung's personal RBX-JM2 differed from the production model, having a second pickup and additional controls.) This instrument was used on Dream Theater's Train of Thought and Octavarium albums and tours.

=== Switch to Music Man ===
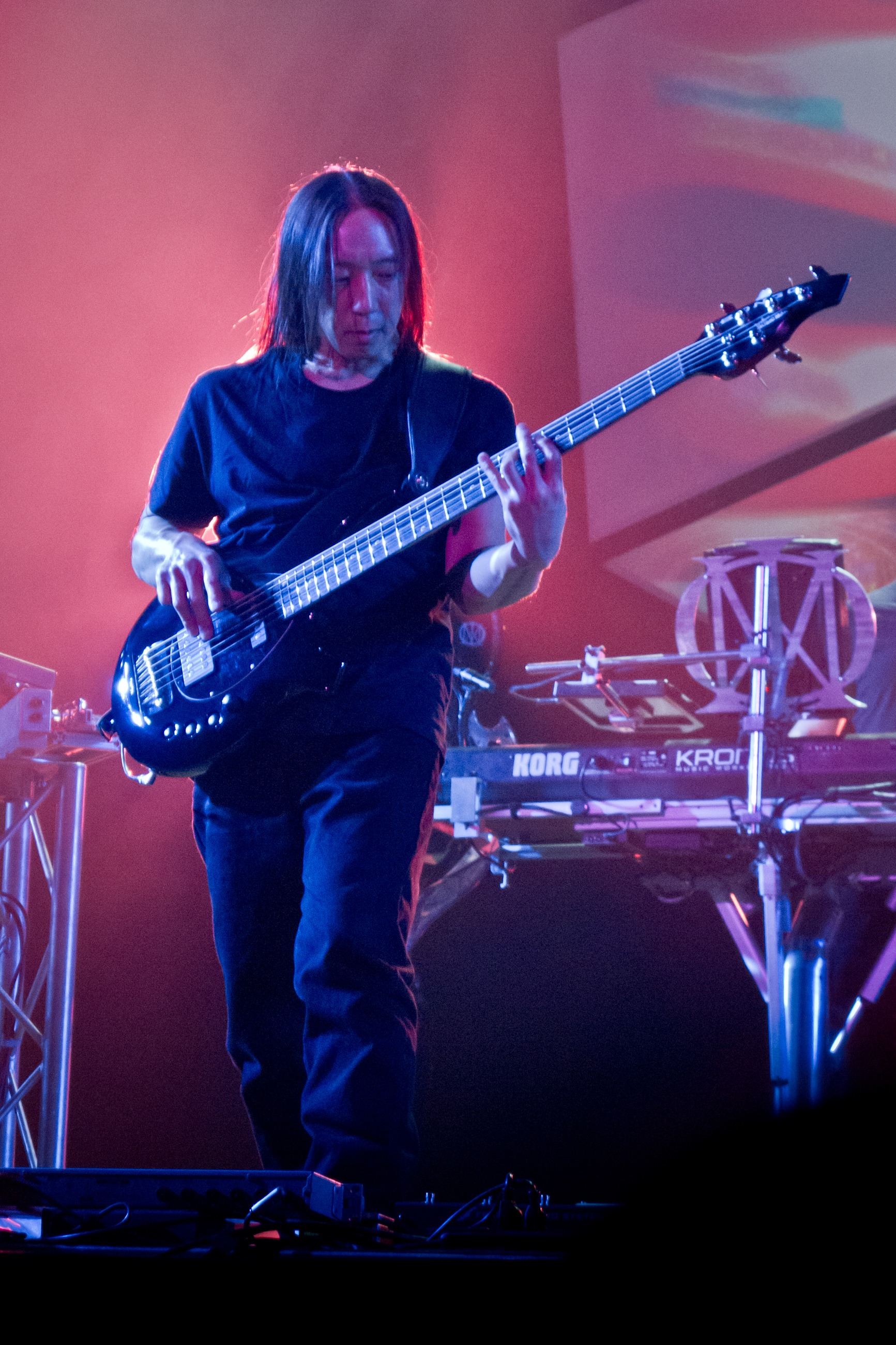
Myung in 2012

Footage from the recording of Systematic Chaos in 2006 showed Myung playing various Music Man basses. Early in the 2007 "Chaos in Motion Tour", he was seen playing a MusicMan Bongo 5 HS in a signature "Inca Silver" (flat gray) finish on stage, the first time since before Images and Words that Myung had toured with a five-string.

On July 23, 2007, Sterling Ball announced that Myung was moving to Music Man, writing that "John has fallen in love with the prototypes that we made of the Bongo 6 and is now playing them exclusively." Ball added that the Bongo 6 "is not a signature bass", but "part of the regular line."

In an interview with MusicRadar in 2010, Myung stated that he was working with Music Man on a modified Bongo. The finished product was a bass with a six-string body but with the six strings accommodating a five-string neck, resulting in a tighter string spacing. In a later interview, he said that this will not be considered a signature model, per Music Man's company policy.. In 2020, Ernie Ball Music Man released the all-new John Myung Signature Bongo Bass.

=== Other instruments ===
Myung has used a twelve-string Grand Chapman Stick on two songs on Falling Into Infinity, "Take Away My Pain" and most prominently "New Millennium", which he performs live on Stick. Dream Theater sources report that Myung routinely brings the Stick to the studio and has sometimes made it so far as tracking (the song "Home" from Scenes from a Memory was originally recorded with a Stick, being replaced with a bass guitar for the final version), but it has not appeared on a Dream Theater studio album since Falling into Infinity. Myung did, however, use the Stick on several tracks on Sean Malone's second album Gordian Knot including "Srikara Tal" and "Redemption's Way." Myung used a fretless bass on the Dream Theater songs "Through Her Eyes", "Far From Heaven", "Hollow Years", "Peruvian Skies", "Hell's Kitchen" and "The Silent Man". He has also used Moog Taurus 3 Bass Pedals since 2011.

== Amplification and effects ==
- Awake era: Mesa Boogie Strategy 400 power amps, Mesa Boogie Bass 400+, and a modified Mesa Boogie Triaxis guitar preamp with several transistors swapped out for ones that would support the lower range of a bass guitar.
- 1998: Custom Build Noisegate, Rocktron Rack interface, Voltage Controlled Amplifier, Steward 4 Channel DI, Mesa Boogie Amp Switcher, modified Mesa Triaxis. Mesa M2000, Mesa Bass 400+, Mesa Abacus, Mesa Strategy 500, Mesa 2x10 wedge monitors, Mesa 1x15+4x10 Cabs, DBX 166, Yamaha spx900
- 2002: SWR SM900 Heads, Demeter Isocabs, two Pearce BC1 Preamps
- 2005: Ashdown RPM1 Preamp, Pearce BC1 Preamp, Mesa Bigblock 750, Ashdown PM1000 Poweramp, Eventide DSP4000, Demeter HBP-1 preamps, a Demeter VTDB-2B mono tube direct box, Demeter HXC-1 optical compressor
- 2007: Two Mesa Bigblock 750, Mesa Bigblock Titan V12, Eventide DSP4000, DBX 166XL, Demeter HBP-1 preamps, a Demeter VTDB-2B mono tube direct box, Demeter HXC-1 optical compressor, Mesa Powerhouse 4x10 and 2x12 Mesa Amp Switcher, Mesa Rectifiers
- 2010: Smaller setup for the tour with Iron Maiden and in South America. Eventide DSP4000, Demeter HBP-1 Preamp, Mesa Bigblock 750, Mesa M9, DBX 166XL, Mesa Amp Switcher
- 2011: A simplified rig including a Shure wireless, Radial Splitter, Demeter HBP-1j Preamp, Tour Supply Multiselector, Fractal Audio Axe Fx, Demeter VTDB-2B DI, Demeter Tube Poweramp, Radial Jdx and also a Demeter cabinet as a dummy load for the poweramp going into the radial jdx.
- 2019: Shure Wireless, Whirlwind Multiselector, MXR Bass Compressor, Ernie Ball Volume pedal, Mesa Boogie Buffered Splitter that splits to a rack drawer with Mesa Boogie Grid Slammer, MXR Bass Octave Deluxe, MXR Bass Chorus Deluxe, TC Electronic Vortex, TC Electronic Flashback, TC Electronic Hall of Fame and RJM Effects Gizmo, all this goes into Ashdown ABM 600 EVO IV, ABM 410 EVO IV. The other split goes to Little Labs Voice of God. He also has a Fractal Axe FX II XL+ on the amp's fx loop.

== Discography ==
=== Dream Theater ===
- The Majesty Demos (1986)
- When Dream and Day Unite (1989)
- Images and Words (1992)
- Live at the Marquee (1993)
- Awake (1994)
- A Change of Seasons (1995)
- Falling into Infinity (1997)
- Once in a LIVEtime (1998)
- Metropolis Pt. 2: Scenes from a Memory (1999)
- Live Scenes From New York (2001)
- Six Degrees Of Inner Turbulence (2002)
- Train Of Thought (2003)
- Live at Budokan (2004)
- Octavarium (2005)
- Score (2006)
- Systematic Chaos (2007)
- Chaos in Motion (2007–2008)
- Black Clouds & Silver Linings (2009)
- A Dramatic Turn of Events (2011)
- Dream Theater (2013)
- Live at Luna Park (2013)
- Breaking the Fourth Wall (2014)
- The Astonishing (2016)
- Distance over Time (2019)
- Distant Memories - Live in London (2020)
- A View from the Top of the World (2021)
- Parasomnia (2025)
- Quarantiéme: Live à Paris (2025)

=== The Jelly Jam ===
- The Jelly Jam (2002)
- The Jelly Jam 2 (2004)
- Shall We Descend (2011)
- ~~Prophet~~ Profit (2016)

=== Platypus ===
- When Pus Comes to Shove (1999)
- Ice Cycles (2000)

=== Gordian Knot ===
- Gordian Knot (1999)

=== Explorers Club ===
- Raising the Mammoth (2002)

=== Rob Silverman ===
- Drumology II (2022) – track "Victory"

== Videography ==
- Dream Theater – Images And Words: Live In Tokyo (1993)
- John Myung – Progressive Bass Concepts (1996)
- Dream Theater – 5 Years in a LIVEtime (1998)
- Dream Theater – Metropolis 2000: Scenes from New York (2001)
- Dream Theater – Live at Budokan (2004)
- Dream Theater – When Dream And Day Reunite (2004)
- Dream Theater – Score (2006)
- Dream Theater – Chaos in Motion (2008)
- Dream Theater – Live at Luna Park (2013)
- Dream Theater – Breaking the Fourth Wall (2014)
- Dream Theater – Distant Memories - Live in London (2020)
- Dream Theater – Quarantiéme: Live à Paris (2025)
