= When Dream and Day Unite =

1989 studio album by Dream Theater

Studio album by Dream Theater
- Released: March 6, 1989
- Recorded: July 18 – August 12, 1988
- Studio: Kajem/Victory Studios in Gladwyne, Pennsylvania
- Genre: Progressive metal
- Length: 51:25
- Label: Mechanic
- Producers: Terry Date; Dream Theater

Dream Theater chronology
The Majesty Demos (1986)	When Dream and Day Unite (1989)	Images and Words (1992)

When Dream and Day Unite is the debut studio album by American progressive metal band Dream Theater, released on March 6, 1989, through Mechanic/MCA Records. The album is composed mostly of material that originally surfaced during the band's early years as Majesty, and it is the only Dream Theater album to be recorded with their full original lineup. James LaBrie replaced Charlie Dominici as the lead vocalist on all subsequent albums.

== Background ==
The band was originally formed in 1985 by Berklee College of Music students John Myung (bass), Mike Portnoy (drums), and John Petrucci (guitar) under the name Majesty, which was inspired by Portnoy's commentary on the ending of "Bastille Day" by Rush. After the band found a keyboardist in Petrucci's childhood friend Kevin Moore, the band hosted auditions and settled on Chris Collins as the lead vocalist.

Majesty recorded The Majesty Demos between 1985 and 1986 but, shortly thereafter, were forced to change their name after another band threatened to take legal action. While touring around New York, Collins left the band, and the band went through many lead singers before settling in with experienced vocalist Charlie Dominici. Still trying to come up with ideas to rename their band, they settled on Portnoy's father suggestion of Dream Theater, which was the name of a nearby movie theater.

Despite not having toured with Dominici, they caught the attention of Mechanic/MCA, who sent a representative to watch them play in the basement of a hair salon where they would practice at the time.

== Recording and songwriting ==
The album was recorded in mid-1988 at Kajem/Victory Studios (a converted gun factory mandated to remain with its original form) in Gladwyne, Pennsylvania, notable for the recording of Operation: Mindcrime by Queensrÿche, and the whole process took three weeks, with the band working only at night.

When analyzing the album in retrospect in 2014, Petrucci described the band back then as "young guys who had a lot of energy and just a real joy in what we were doing. We had a tunnel vision and didn’t think about anything else other than playing this music that felt natural to us. We didn't have any conversations about the kind of band that we wanted to be, or the direction of songs. The music was just the way it came out as we were writing. So I think it has a lot of that spontaneity and that kind of fire, that spirit." Portnoy said that, not counting the low-budget production and the fact that it's their only album without vocalist James LaBrie, "that’s definitely the blueprint of the Dream Theater sound right there".

== Promotion and impact ==
With the relatively warm reception of their original demos, the band expected their debut album to be received with much fanfare and buzz, but the album went largely unnoticed by the music industry, and eventually led to Mechanic/MCA cutting their contract ties with the band, resulting in a small club tour for the album exclusively in the New York area, since no label-backed tours happened. They also produced two promotional singles, "Status Seeker" and "Afterlife", whose remixes and single edits for radio were done by Terry Brown of Rush production fame.

The commercial failure of their very first attempt at becoming professionals and the lack of support from the label impacted them negatively and nearly brought the band to an end. Tensions within the group and creative differences culminated with Dominici being fired, and they were without a lead singer until late 1990. As Petrucci describes, they were then "just an instrumental band without a record label, without a singer, and wondering if this was ever going to happen". After several singer auditions, they picked James LaBrie and started writing music for their next album Images and Words.

== 15th anniversary performance ==
On the 15th anniversary of the album, the band performed it in its entirety in Los Angeles. Furthermore, during two additional songs in the encore, special guests Dominici and Derek Sherinian (both then former Dream Theater members) performed along with the rest of the band; original keyboardist Kevin Moore did not appear. The entire performance was recorded live and first released on CD and DVD under the title When Dream and Day Reunite through Portnoy's independent label YtseJam Records and later reissued officially via InsideOut as part of Dream Theater's Lost Not Forgotten Archives series. The album also featured a live version of "Metropolis—Part I", which was originally from the band's 1992 album Images and Words, and a performance of a B-side from Awake called "To Live Forever", both originally written shortly after the release of When Dream and Day Unite, and played live on the tour for the album.

== Critical reception ==
Professional ratings
Review scores
Source	Rating
AllMusic	3/5 stars
Collector's Guide to Heavy Metal	7/10

When Dream and Day Unite did not receive much attention upon release. The Colorado Springs Gazette-Telegraph concluded that the music "is well-intentioned, but so overplayed that it leaves the listener guessing which odd-time signature or tempo change will bolt out of the darkness next."

Due to the commercial success of Images and Words, the album later received critical reviews and criticism from many resources. Robert Taylor of AllMusic remarked an obvious Queensrÿche influence in the band's "progressive metal" music and defined Petrucci and Portnoy "competent musicians", whose "individual styles were not yet refined"; he criticized the "subpar singing, too many metal clichés, and poor production", but added that the album has "enough interesting playing to make it a worthwhile listen for fans of this genre." Canadian journalist Martin Popoff positively reviewed the album, stating it contained "startingly progressive yet very heavy and explosive prog metal", but criticized the "clattery, thin production of Terry Date" and the sound of keyboards and drums.

It is the only Dream Theater album that failed to chart on the Billboard 200.

== Track listing ==
All music is composed by Dream Theater, except where noted.

No.	Title	Lyrics	Length
1.	"A Fortune in Lies"	John Petrucci	5:12
2.	"Status Seeker"	Charlie Dominici, Petrucci	4:17
3.	"The Ytse Jam" (music: Petrucci, John Myung, Kevin Moore, Mike Portnoy)	(instrumental)	5:46
4.	"The Killing Hand": "I The Observance"; "II Ancient Renewal"; "III The Stray Seed"; "IV Thorns"; "V Exodus"	Petrucci	8:41
5.	"Light Fuse and Get Away"	Moore	7:23
6.	"Afterlife"	Dominici	5:26
7.	"The Ones Who Help to Set the Sun"	Petrucci	8:05
8.	"Only a Matter of Time"	Moore	6:35
Total length:			51:25

== Personnel ==
Dream Theater

- Charlie Dominici – lead vocals
- Kevin Moore – keyboards
- John Myung – bass guitar
- John Petrucci – guitars
- Mike Portnoy – drums, percussion

Production

- Dream Theater – producers
- Terry Date – producer, engineer, mixing
- Joe Alexander – engineer, mixing
- Brian Stover, Trish Finnegan – assistant engineers
- Steve Sinclair – executive producer
- Amy Guip – cover art

== Charts ==
Chart (1989)	Peak position
Japanese Albums (Oricon)	98
