= Falling into Infinity =

1997 studio album by Dream Theater

Studio album by Dream Theater
- Released: September 23, 1997
- Recorded: June 2 – July 30, 1997
- Studios: Avatar, New York City
- Genres: Progressive metal; progressive rock
- Length: 78:12
- Label: EastWest
- Producer: Kevin Shirley

Dream Theater chronology
A Change of Seasons (1995)	Falling into Infinity (1997)	Once in a LIVEtime (1998)

Singles from Falling into Infinity
- 1. "Hollow Years" Released: 1997

Falling into Infinity is the fourth studio album by American progressive metal band Dream Theater, released on September 23, 1997, through EastWest Records. It is the band's only studio album to feature keyboardist Derek Sherinian, following the departure of Kevin Moore in 1994.

Falling into Infinity was produced by Kevin Shirley. The album's writing and pre-production phases were stressful periods for the band, as they were feeling constant pressure from the record label to deliver a more radio-friendly album. It was recorded in June 1997 at Avatar Studios (previously known as Power Station Studios) in Manhattan.

== Background ==
Following a brief tour in support of the A Change of Seasons EP, Dream Theater entered Dream Factory Studios in East Rutherford, New Jersey, in early 1996 to begin writing material for a new album. It was their first time writing with keyboardist Derek Sherinian, who replaced Kevin Moore in 1994. Around this time, Elektra Records was exerting pressure on the band to write concise, radio-friendly songs. Consequently, creative conflicts arose, with guitarist John Petrucci accepting the label's plea for change and drummer Mike Portnoy fighting against it.

For over a year, Dream Theater wrote songs without being given permission to record them; according to Portnoy, at one point they became so frustrated that they considered retirement. In March 1997, the band was finally given the go-ahead to record the new album with Kevin Shirley producing. By May, the band had enough material for a double album but was told to keep it to one disc for budget reasons. As a result, certain songs were not included on the final cut of the album, including "Raise the Knife", "Where Are You Now", "Cover My Eyes", "Speak to Me", "The Way It Used to Be", and "Metropolis Pt. 2", the latter of which was later expanded into its own album, with the rest being included on the 1999 fan club CD "Cleaning Out the Closet". Shirley made significant alterations to some of what was left on the album; most notably, he took the middle section out of "Burning My Soul" and turned it into what would become "Hell's Kitchen". Shirley also recommended that the band work with Desmond Child to re-write "You or Me", resulting in Petrucci being flown down to Florida to work on the song with Child. Following the sessions, the song became "You Not Me".

Actual recording for the album began on June 2, 1997, at Avatar Studios (now The Power Station) in New York City. In contrast to the difficult writing and pre-production stages, the band considered the recording sessions trouble free and enjoyable. The album, titled Falling into Infinity, was completed on July 30. Originally, Petrucci and Portnoy wanted to call it Stream of Consciousness, but the rest of the band rejected the name because they felt it was too pompous (although the phrase "Stream of Consciousness" is found in the song "Lines in the Sand" and would later become the title of the instrumental piece on Train of Thought). Its eventual title was proposed by Petrucci, and its cover art was designed by Storm Thorgerson.

== Composition ==
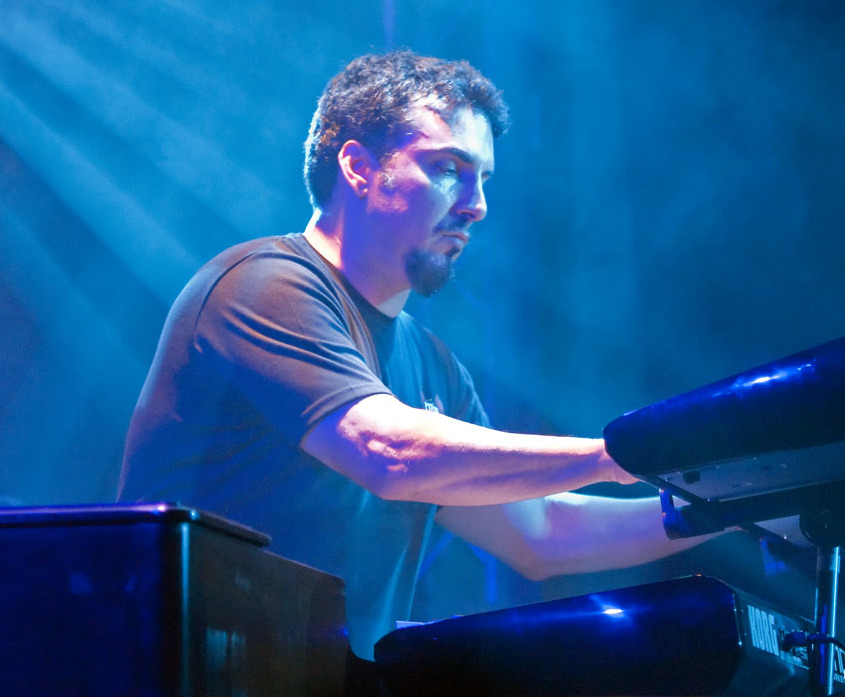
Falling into Infinity is Dream Theater's only studio album to feature keyboardist Derek Sherinian (pictured in 2012).

Falling into Infinity is the first Dream Theater album to feature multiple songs with lyrics by Mike Portnoy. Portnoy and the rest of the band were forced to write more lyrics following the departure of Kevin Moore. All of Portnoy's lyrics were inspired by his frustration with Elektra Records: "New Millennium" and "Just Let Me Breathe" are aimed at the music industry and label, and "Burning My Soul" targets A&R man Derek Oliver. John Petrucci wrote lyrics for six songs on the album, including "Peruvian Skies"; lead singer James LaBrie and bassist John Myung each contributed lyrics to one song each, "Anna Lee" and "Trial of Tears" respectively; while "Hell's Kitchen" is an instrumental. Both "Peruvian Skies" and "Anna Lee" deal with the subject of child abuse. As is the case with most Dream Theater albums, the songs were given working titles during production; for example, "Lines in the Sand" and "Burning My Soul" were originally called "Cat's Tail" and "Carnival of Clams", respectively.

In the official Dream Theater biography Lifting Shadows, author Rich Wilson described Falling into Infinity's musical style as having an "accessible nature". In his review of the album for AllMusic, Jeremy Ulrey noted of the album: "Like many other progressive bands playing difficult music, Dream Theater inevitably chose to trim down both their bombastic production and intricate songwriting for a more laid-back approach, both live and in the studio." Its writing was inspired by a multitude of artists including Elton John.

== Release ==
Professional ratings
Review scores
Source	Rating
AllMusic	3/5 stars
Collector's Guide to Heavy Metal	7/10
Kerrang!	3/5 stars

Falling into Infinity was released on September 23, 1997. In America, the album debuted at number 52 on the Billboard 200. Falling into Infinity received mixed reviews from critics and fans. In a three out of five star review for AllMusic, Jeremy Ulrey called it "the band's weakest effort since their debut." Rich Wilson has described it as "one of the patchier albums in the band's catalogue."

According to Lifting Shadows, Falling into Infinity was considered a commercial failure, failing to break any new ground for Dream Theater or increase their sales despite its more commercial direction. As a result of the creative and personal tensions experienced during the album's production phase, it has been described as the band's "most difficult album", and eventually led to their demanding to be free from record label interference for all future albums. Mike Portnoy has mentioned that if Elektra Records, Kevin Shirley, and Desmond Child were not involved in the making of the album, he would have made a "completely different record". In 2007, the band released a demo version of the album reflecting Portnoy's original song arrangements and track listing, including a live rehearsal of the original "Metropolis Pt. 2".

In contrast to Portnoy's comments, John Petrucci has spoken fondly of the album, and in a 2014 interview stated, "Maybe I could set the records straight: I think that’s a really big misunderstanding. The label didn’t have an influence on the album. We wrote the kind of album we wanted to write."

== Track listing ==
All music is composed by Dream Theater.

No.	Title	Lyrics	Length
1.	"New Millennium"	Mike Portnoy	8:20
2.	"You Not Me"	John Petrucci, Desmond Child	4:58
3.	"Peruvian Skies"	Petrucci	6:43
4.	"Hollow Years"	Petrucci	5:53
5.	"Burning My Soul"	Portnoy	5:29
6.	"Hell's Kitchen"	(instrumental)	4:16
7.	"Lines in the Sand"	Petrucci	12:05
8.	"Take Away My Pain"	Petrucci	6:03
9.	"Just Let Me Breathe"	Portnoy	5:28
10.	"Anna Lee"	James LaBrie	5:51
11.	"Trial of Tears": "I - It's Raining"; "II - Deep in Heaven"; "III - The Wasteland"	John Myung	13:06
Total length:			78:12

Japanese edition 3" bonus disc
No.	Title	Lyrics	Length
1.	"Take Away My Pain" (demo version)	Petrucci	6:49
2.	"Speak to Me" (demo version)	LaBrie	6:25

== Personnel ==
Dream Theater

- James LaBrie – lead and backing vocals, arrangements
- John Myung – bass, Chapman Stick, arrangements
- John Petrucci – guitars, backing vocals, arrangements
- Mike Portnoy – drums, percussion, backing vocals, arrangements
- Derek Sherinian – keyboards, backing vocals, arrangements

Additional credits

- Doug Pinnick – additional vocals on "Lines in the Sand"
- Kevin Shirley – engineering, mixing, producer
- Rich Alvy – engineering assistance
- Barbara Lipke – engineering assistance
- Dave Swope – mixing assistance
- Leon Zervos – mastering
- Storm Thorgerson – cover art

== Charts ==
Chart (1997)	Peak position
Canada Top Albums/CDs (RPM)	53
Dutch Albums (Album Top 100)	16
Finnish Albums (Suomen virallinen lista)	5
French Albums (SNEP)	42
German Albums (Offizielle Top 100)	9
Hungarian Albums (MAHASZ)	10
Japanese Albums (Oricon)	16
Norwegian Albums (VG-lista)	20
Swedish Albums (Sverigetopplistan)	14
Swiss Albums (Schweizer Hitparade)	43
US Billboard 200	52
