= New World (Dave Kerzner album) =

Studio album by Dave Kerzner
- Released: 9 December 2014 (Standard Edition); 31 January 2015 (Deluxe Edition)
- Recorded: 2014; Sonic Reality Studios, Miami, Florida; Reseda Ranch Studios, Reseda, Los Angeles, California; Cloud City Sound, Portland, Oregon; The Farm Studios, Vancouver, British Columbia, Canada; Phantom Recordings, Sherman Oaks, Los Angeles, California
- Genre: Progressive rock Rock
- Length: 1:17:57 (Standard Edition); 2:23:44 (Deluxe Edition)
- Label: RecPlay Inc
- Producer: Dave Kerzner

Singles from New World
- 1. "Stranded" Released: 9 September 2014

New World is the debut solo album by American musician, songwriter, producer and sound designer Dave Kerzner. This is Kerzner's first album since his departure from the band Sound of Contact, and was developed in 2014. The album features numerous collaborations with established artists such as Fernando Perdomo, Steve Hackett, Nick D'Virgilio, Durga McBroom and Keith Emerson. Two versions of the album were developed: a standard edition and a two-disc double album deluxe edition. The former was released in December 2014, and the latter was released in January 2015.

The album was produced and mixed by Kerzner. Most of the album was recorded remotely with reference tracks developed by Kerzner using music software technology from his sound production company Sonic Reality. The tracks were then re-recorded by other artists at remote locations and sent back to Kerzner's studio in Miami for mixing. Veteran mixing engineer Tom Lord-Alge mixed the album's first single release, "Stranded."

== Concept ==
New World is a concept album. The story takes place in a future world consisting primarily of hazardous desert terrain where numerous biodomes of massive scale contain and protect the global populace. The album revolves around a character known as The Traveler; stranded in the desert and clinging to life, he embarks on a journey to return to the biodome from which he originates while recounting the events that led him to his fatal situation.

The story serves as an allegory for one's own spiritual and subconscious evolution. The Traveler, in his struggle for survival, undergoes a metamorphosis from the position of victim to a figure of immense capacity and conquers his own personal demons, empowered through his discovery of the light amidst a shroud of darkness and uncertainty.

== Development ==
After leaving Sound of Contact, Kerzner decided to focus on numerous other projects including a solo album. A kickstarter campaign was launched in July 2014 to help fund the album, raising a total of nearly $32,000 in support of its development. Writing and recording for New World occurred in the meantime with many of Kerzner's supporters preferring a double album over a single album. All of the compositions were written on either piano or guitar. Inspiration was taken from such bands as Genesis, Queen, King Crimson, Pink Floyd, ELO and The Beatles, as Kerzner's approach was to offer "one foot in nostalgia, one in the modern world" and to infuse recognizable classic rock and progressive rock influences with his own songwriting style.

In order to find musicians who would assist him in recording the album, Kerzner contacted several individuals who had previously worked with him through his sound production company Sonic Reality or through other musical collaborations. Numerous musicians agreed to work on the album, including Nick D'Virgilio, Fernando Perdomo, Francis Dunnery, and Durga McBroom. D'Virgilio, a significant contributor to the album, was Kerzner's bandmate in Kevin Gilbert's band Thud. The tracks "Theta" and "My Old Friend" offer tribute to Gilbert, reuniting several of his old bandmates and acquaintances for its recording.

During the recording process for most of the album's songs, Kerzner first developed mock-up tracks for the other musicians to use as a reference. These mock-up tracks consisted of him playing all of the instruments on his keyboard using Sonic Reality's music software products and sound library. Various types of drum mock-ups were created using samples from his Nick Mason drum library and other sample libraries. The tracks were then sent to his collaborators and guest musicians for them to use as a reference when they re-recorded live versions for the album. Each musician recorded their tracks at a remote location, some in their own studios. They were also permitted to provide their own interpretation of the mock-up tracks in order to offer their own signature to their respective contributions. Drummer Simon Phillips, for example, kept this interpretative leeway in mind while recording the drums for "Crossing of Fates" at Phantom Recordings in Los Angeles. These tracks were then sent back to Kerzner in Miami for mixing at South Beach Studios.

A few songs such as "Under Control" and "Solitude" feature Kerzner playing all of the instruments including drums on the final recording. For these, he played all tracks on his keyboard using his sample library. "Crossing of Fates" was developed during a jam session with keyboardist Keith Emerson, a guest musician on the album;. the song is a tribute to Emerson and features him performing a synthesizer solo.

The album was given the title New World. Two versions were developed: a standard edition and a two-disc double album deluxe edition. As New World was composed as a double album, the deluxe edition places all of the songs in their proper order, offering the intended cinematic storytelling aspect of the album.

== Release and promotion ==
During the New World Kickstarter campaign, Kerzner released a series of videos on YouTube and on the Kickstarter website discussing the album and tracking its development. Jason Scheff, a contributor on the album, also spoke publicly in support of the Kickstarter campaign. Those who supported the campaign were provided with a "backstage pass" so that they could follow the development of the album through video blogs and have access to in-development versions of songs. Additional bonus packages were awarded to the campaign's backers.

The song "Stranded" debuted on Planet Rock radio in August 2014 during a show hosted by Keith Emerson. "Stranded" was subsequently released as a single in September 2014, prior to the full album's release. The song was made available on iTunes, Amazon, Google Play and through other online retailers. An official YouTube version was also posted. Veteran mixing engineer Tom Lord-Alge mixed the track. A radio-friendly single version was also released, titled "Stranded Part 1 - Isolation."

The standard edition of New World was released in December 2014 in both digital and physical formats. A twelve-minute album preview was also posted on YouTube. The two-disc double album deluxe edition of the album was released in January 2015.

A core touring band has been announced featuring guitarist Fernando Perdomo, drummer Derek Cintron, and vocalist Durga McBroom. Other musicians featured on the album are slated to perform live when schedules permit. In March 2015 the band was announced as part of the performance lineup for the Cruise To The Edge 2015 event, using the name Dave Kerzner Band.

== Critical reception ==
In his review of the album, Rich Wilson of Prog Magazine stated that "Kerzner possesses a skillful knack for augmenting his wide-ranging influences with his own modern, distinctive style, giving the music an original twist... he’s recorded something of such immeasurable quality that it legitimately outstrips anything he has recorded before." According to Wilson, "New World is a spellbinding modern progressive rock collection that proves Kerzner’s a solo artist to reckon with." Prog Magazine's 2014 Readers' Poll, meanwhile, ranked New World tenth on its Album of the Year rankings. Kerzner, for his work on the album, was ranked tenth on the poll's Keyboard Player of the Year list. The magazine credited Kerzner for his "keen eye for prog glories past, and also his shrewd engineer’s ear for what today’s tech can bring to the template." Kerzner's vocals have been compared to those of Eric Woolfson and David Gilmour.

Scott Lade of The Fire Note gave the album 4 out of 5 stars, identifying his key tracks as "The Lie," "My Old Friend" and "Nothing." He concluded that New World is an album featuring "magnificent soundscapes and heady but user-friendly prog." Jordan Rudess of Dream Theater featured the album on his official website in February 2015, proclaiming that New World immediately caught his attention. He additionally expressed his appreciation for the "elegantly and powerfully crafted" textures of Kerzner's music, invoking the musical textures of Pink Floyd and Alan Parsons.

== Track listing ==
=== Standard Edition ===
All tracks are written by Dave Kerzner, except where noted.

No.	Title	Writer(s)	Length
1.	"Stranded, Pts. 1-5: Part One: Isolation; Part Two: Delirium; Part Three: March of the Machines; Part Four: Source Sublme; Part Five: The Darkness"		10:31
2.	"Into the Sun"		7:20
3.	"The Lie"		5:03
4.	"Under Control"		5:54
5.	"Crossing of Fates" (Instrumental)		4:48
6.	"My Old Friend"		5:27
7.	"Ocean of Stars"		5:35
8.	"Solitude"		3:40
9.	"Nothing"	Kerzner, Fernando Perdomo	6:15
10.	"New World"		5:57
11.	"Redemption (Stranded, Pts. 6-10): Part Six: The Oasis; Part Seven: Resilience II; Part Eight: High On The Dunes; Part Nine: Mirage Of The Machines; Part Ten: To The Light"	Kerzner, Francis Dunnery	17:27
Total length:			77:57

=== Deluxe Edition ===
The Deluxe Edition is a double album, consisting of extended versions of tracks in addition to new compositions.

==== Disc One ====
All tracks are written by Dave Kerzner, except where noted.

No.	Title	Writer(s)	Length
1.	"Stranded, Pts. 1-5: Part One: Isolation; Part Two: Delirium; Part Three: March of the Machines; Part Four: Source Sublme; Part Five: The Darkness" (Instrumental)		11:28
2.	"Into the Sun"		9:19
3.	"The Lie"		5:05
4.	"The Traveler"		2:02
5.	"Secret"		8:09
6.	"Reflection"		1:44
7.	"Under Control"		6:12
8.	"Premonition Suite: Part One: Premonition; Part Two: Resilience I; Part Three: Subtle Signs Of Life; Part Four: Altered State; Part Five: Illuminessence"	Kerzner, Dunnery	8:55
9.	"In The Garden"		6:16
10.	"The Way Out"		5:24
11.	"Recurring Dream"		4:30

==== Disc Two ====
All tracks are written by Dave Kerzner, except where noted.

No.	Title	Writer(s)	Length
1.	"Biodome" (Instrumental)		1:31
2.	"Crossing of Fates" (Instrumental)		4:49
3.	"Theta"		4:01
4.	"My Old Friend"		5:18
5.	"Ocean of Stars"		6:41
6.	"Solitude"		5:00
7.	"Nothing"	Kerzner, Perdomo	6:17
8.	"Erased" (Instrumental)		2:03
9.	"Realign"		5:04
10.	"Nexus" (Instrumental)		5:38
11.	"New World"		5:44
12.	"Redemption (Stranded, Pts. 6-10): Part Six: The Oasis; Part Seven: Resilience II; Part Eight: High On The Dunes; Part Nine: Mirage Of The Machines; Part Ten: To The Light"	Kerzner, Dunnery	21:32

No.	Title	Length
Total length:		143:44

== Personnel ==
=== Primary contributors ===
- Dave Kerzner – lead vocals, keyboards, guitar, drum programming, sound design
- Fernando Perdomo – guitar, bass
- Nick D'Virgilio - drums

=== Additional musicians ===
- Ana Cristina - vocals; "Stranded", "Premonition Suite"
- Francis Dunnery - guitar; "New World," "Premonition Suite", "Redemption II"
- Colin Edwin - bass; "Into The Sun"
- Keith Emerson - Moog; "Crossing Of Fates"
- Heather Findlay - vocals; "Into The Sun", "The Traveler"
- Steve Hackett - guitar; "Stranded", "Redemption"
- Christine Leakey - vocals; "Ocean Of Stars", "Premonition Suite"
- David Longdon - vocals; "New World", "Biodome"
- Emily Lynn - vocals; "Solitude," "Redemption," "Premonition Suite", "The Way Out"
- Durga McBroom - vocals; "Stranded," "Ocean of Stars," "Premonition Suite," "In The Garden," "Redemption", "The Way Out"
- Lorelei McBroom - vocals; "Ocean Of Stars", "Solitude"
- Russ Parrish - guitar; "My Old Friend"
- Simon Phillips - drums; "Crossing Of Fates"
- Satnam Ramgotra - tablas; "Theta"
- Jason Scheff - vocals; "Stranded", "Redemption"
- Billy Sherwood - bass; "Crossing Of Fates"
- Lara Smiles - vocals; "Solitude"
- Maryem Tollar - vocals; "Theta", "My Old Friend"

== Production ==
- Produced by Dave Kerzner
- Vocals, Guitars and Keyboards recorded by Dave Kerzner, Fernando Perdomo
- Drums recorded by Chris Holmes, Justin Phelps, Mark Hornsby, Simon Phillips
- Maryem Tollar recorded by Ernie Tollar
- Steve Hackett's Guitars recorded by Roger King
- Mixed by Dave Kerzner; "Stranded, Pts. 1-5" mixed by Tom Lord-Alge
- Mastered by Gavin Lurssen and Reuben Cohen
