= Synthesia =

Synthesia may refer to:

- Synthesia (company), a synthetic media generation platform used to create AI-generated video content
- Synthesia (video game), a piano keyboard trainer

== See also ==
- Synaesthesia (disambiguation)
