= Synaesthesia (disambiguation) =

Synaesthesia (or synesthesia) is a perceptual experience.

Synaesthesia or Synaesthete may also refer to:

== Music ==
=== Bands ===
- Synæsthesia (Canadian band), an ambient music duo 1995–2001
- Synaesthesia (English band), now known as Kyros, a rock and pop band

=== Albums ===
- Synesthesia (Buck 65 album), 2001
- Synesthesia (Chicago Underground Duo album), 2000
- Synesthesia (Courage My Love album) or the title song, 2017
- Synaesthesia (Kyros album), 2014
- Synesthesia – I Think in Colours, by Alle Farben, or the title song, 2014
- Without Words: Synesthesia, by Bethel Music, or the title song, 2015
- Synaesthesia, by Andy Summers, 1995
- Synesthesia, by Peter Himmelman, 1989

=== Songs ===
- "Synesthesia" (song), by Andrew McMahon, 2013
- "Synaesthesia", by the Thrillseekers, 1999
- "Ôrödyagzou" ("Synaesthesia"), a song written in Ithkuil by the band Kaduatán

== Other uses ==
- Synaesthesia (rhetorical device), in literature, when one sense is described in terms of another
- Synthesia (video game), a 2006 music game
- Synaesthete (video game), a 2007 freeware music game
- Synesthesia Mandala Drums, a brand of electronic drum pads
- Synesthesia, a 2005 film featuring Masanobu Ando
- Detective Wanda "Synaesthesia" Jackson, a character from Top 10
