= Stranded (Dave Kerzner song) =

Single by Dave Kerzner

from the album New World
- Released: September 9, 2014
- Genre: Rock opera
- Length: 10:31
- Label: RecPlay, Inc.
- Songwriter(s): Dave Kerzner
- Producer(s): Dave Kerzner

"Stranded" is a song recorded by American musician and songwriter Dave Kerzner. The single is Kerzner's debut as a solo artist from his album New World.

The first track on the album New World, Stranded is a five-part rock opera that introduces the album's theme as well as an individual known as "The Traveler". The Traveler moves through a future world with his experiences chronicled in Stranded as well as each song of the album.

At the time of its release in 2014, the full-length album-version of the single was available as a downloadable EP in both MP3 and FLAC formats. A video to accompany the single was released by Kerzner on YouTube as a lyric video feature in conjunction with the song's release on September 9, 2014.

== Reviews ==
In its December 17, 2014, online review of "Stranded", The Prog Report noted the song's "obvious" influence from the band Pink Floyd and stated, "The opening of "Stranded" is haunting and commands attention...the quality of the production is evident." The review further stated that the "vocal barrage" at the end of the track showed Kerzner's ability to "separate himself from simply a reincarnation of his influences."

== Credits ==
=== Musicians ===
- Dave Kerzner – lead vocals, keyboards, guitar, drum programming, sound design
- Fernando Perdomo – guitar, bass
- Nick D'Virgilio – drums
- Ana Cristina – vocals
- Steve Hackett – guitar
- Durga McBroom – vocals
- Jason Scheff – vocals

=== Production ===
- Dave Kerzner – Producer
- Dave Kerzner, Tom Lord-Alge – Mixing and sound engineering
