= Sound of Contact =

British-based progressive rock band

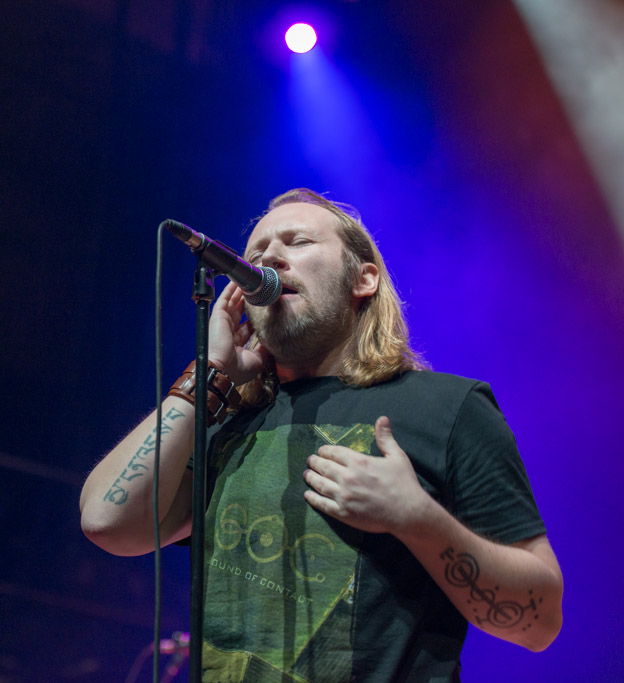
- Simon Collins performs during the First Contact concert at l'Olympia in Montreal Canada during the Marillion Weekend in March 2013

Background information
- Also known as: In Continuum
- Origin: Miami, Florida, U.S.
- Genres: Progressive rock; alternative rock; hard rock; pop rock
- Years active: 2009–present
- Label: Inside Out
- Members: Matt Dorsey; Dave Kerzner
- Past members: Simon Collins; Kelly Nordstrom

Sound of Contact is a British-based progressive rock band currently consisting of Matt Dorsey (guitars, bass) and Dave Kerzner (keyboards, guitars), with Simon Collins (lead vocals, drums, percussion) and Kelly Nordstrom (guitars, bass) previously being members. Formed in 2009, the band released their debut album in May 2013.

== History ==
Co-founding members of the band, Simon Collins and Dave Kerzner, met in New York at rehearsals for Genesis in 2006. While Genesis was on its Turn It On Again tour during 2007, Collins and Kerzner, along with Kelly Nordstrom, recorded a cover of the 1981 Genesis song, "Keep It Dark," as a tribute to Collins' father, Phil Collins. The younger Collins then developed his 2008 solo album, U-Catastrophe, in association with Kerzner and Nordstrom, who contributed to the album as songwriters and performers. Collins met Matt Dorsey through their record label while forming a touring band for his U-Catastrophe tour. Nordstrom had worked with Collins for several years as a guitarist, bassist and songwriter, contributing to his 2005 album, Time For Truth as well as U-Catastrophe.

In 2009, Collins approached Kerzner about forming a band. After enlisting help from Nordstrom and Dorsey, work began on their first project as a band in Miami, Florida, with the end result being their first album, Dimensionaut. After the album's release, Nordstrom made the decision to leave the band due to family commitments. Following several months of touring and promotion, Kerzner announced his departure from the band in January 2014 in order to concentrate on his company Sonic Reality and pursue his own music projects. Kerzner and Nordstrom rejoined the band in April 2015 and began working with Collins and Dorsey in Oxfordshire on the group's second album, but on 20 January 2018, Collins and Nordstrom both announced their departure from the group. At present it is unknown whether the band will continue, although Dorsey and Kerzner have formed a new band In Continuum, with which they recorded and released the material originally meant for the second Sound of Contact album.

== Musical style ==
Collins' musical influences were from his father, Phil Collins, and his band Genesis, as well as the electronica, punk, grunge, and new wave genres. From 2007 to 2010, Dorsey was a member of the punk rock band Dead Mechanical, as well as a member of Collins' solo touring band.

Collins described Sound of Contact as a crossover progressive rock band, taking a modern approach to the genre, while also maintaining a pop sound that was present in progressive rock of the 1970s.

== Album ==
Between 2010 and 2012, the group developed and recorded their first and only studio album, Dimensionaut, with assistance from sound engineers Nick Davis and Chris Holmes. The band recorded in trios at Vancouver, British Columbia's Greenhouse Studios, then moved work on the album to England as well as Kerzner's Sonic Reality studios in Miami. After the group publicly announced the band's identity as "Sound of Contact" in December 2012, an online video teaser for Dimensionaut was released. Sound of Contact signed its first recording contract with Inside Out Music in March 2013. Dimensionaut was released worldwide in late May 2013, with "Not Coming Down" released as the band's first single and "Pale Blue Dot," its second single released in March 2014.

== Concerts and touring ==
Tour dates and concerts were scheduled for the band after they signed a recording contract with Inside Out Music. In conjunction with the bands Marillion and Spock's Beard, Sound of Contact performed in their concert debut on 24 March 2013 in Montreal, Quebec, Canada. The band then traveled to Europe for a short tour with Spock's Beard and Beardfish in May 2013 beginning in Sheffield, England and ending in Hamburg, Germany. During the summer of 2013, Sound of Contact traveled back to Germany to perform at the "Night of the Prog" festival in Lorelei. A 2014 Dimensionaut tour was announced in March 2014, beginning a month later in Los Angeles, California and ending on 12 May 2014 in Copenhagen, Denmark.

In April 2014, the band performed on both the Moody Blues Cruise and Cruise to the Edge, and also made its television debut in the same month on the KDFW morning program "Good Day Dallas".

== Awards ==
Sound of Contact received the "Limelight" award for Best New Group at the second-annual Progressive Music Awards held in September 2013.

== Personnel ==
Current members

- Matt Dorsey - bass, guitars, backing vocals (2009–present)
- Dave Kerzner - keyboards, guitars, backing vocals (2009-2014, 2015–present)

Former members

- Simon Collins - lead vocals, drums, percussion (2009–2018)
- Kelly Nordstrom - guitars, bass (2009-2013, 2015–2018)

Touring musicians

- Jonathan Schang - drums (2013)
- Ronen Gordon - drums (2013–present)
- Bill Jenkins - keyboards (2013–present)
- Randy McStine - guitars (2013–present)
- John Wesley - guitars(2013)

== Discography ==
=== Studio albums ===
- Dimensionaut (2013)

=== Singles ===
- "Not Coming Down" (2013)
- "Pale Blue Dot" (2014)
