= Dimensionaut =

Studio album by Sound of Contact
- Released: 20 May 2013 (Europe); 28 May 2013 (North America)
- Recorded: 2010–2012
- Studio: Greenhouse Studios (Vancouver, British Columbia, Canada)
- Genre: Progressive rock
- Length: 73:38
- Label: Inside Out
- Producer: Simon Collins and Dave Kerzner

Singles from Dimensionaut
- 1. "Not Coming Down" Released: 14 May 2013; 2. "Pale Blue Dot" Released: 7 March 2014

Dimensionaut is the only album by British-based band Sound of Contact, released worldwide in May 2013. Production of the album was a collaborative effort between Simon Collins and Dave Kerzner, two of the band's founding members. As of March 2014, two singles off the album have been released.

Dimensionaut was mixed by veteran sound engineer Nick Davis, known for working with Genesis.

== Concept ==
Dimensionaut is a concept album. Its plot follows an alienated, unnamed human who is tired of humanity and embraces his fate as a traveller of dimensions, time and galaxies, capable of existing in multiple dimensions, upon the arrival of the "Cosmic Distance Ladder." Though unnamed, the protagonist assumes the role of a "dimensionaut" or "dimo," which he declares in the song "I Am (Dimensionaut)." Throughout the story, the dimensionaut constructs his escape from reality, realising new experiences but also struggling with the isolation and loneliness of his complex new world. Eventually, his human need for love and his desire to reunite with his soulmate bring him to visit her in "Beyond Illumination" and "Closer To You." Realizing she can not travel with him, the protagonist assists her journey back to reality in "Omega Point." The album's conclusion is left open-ended, as the dimensionaut may have either followed her back to reality or remained an eternal traveller, resigned to explore.

== Development ==
Prior to work on Dimensionaut, Collins and Nordstrom performed research in the areas of cosmology, quantum physics, astrophysics and astronomy, to develop the album's storyline. Some of the album's lyrics were written during this phase of Dimensionaut's development. This stage of the album's development dates back to as early as 2010.

The foundation for some of the album's material already existed in the form of unfinished compositions, melody lines and ideas written by Kerzner. After Collins completed his 2008 album U-Catastrophe, he began work on Dimensionaut with what he referred to as a "blank canvas". According to Collins, the lyrics had not yet been written for what was to become Sound of Contact's first album.

Kerzner states the song "Not Coming Down" was inspired by the death of his friend and former bandmate, Kevin Gilbert. According to Kerzner, the song explores the "fragility of life."

The band continued to write new material while recording the album and briefly considered releasing Dimensionaut as a double album, but opted to save the extra material for future use. As they continued to write, additional space was preserved for improvisation and refinement of their written material. Recorded jam sessions became the music for "Omega Point" and a significant portion of "Möbius Slip."

The album was written and recorded over a period of five to six months between 2011 and 2012 with assistance from sound engineers Nick Davis and Chris Holmes. The band recorded in trios at Vancouver, British Columbia's Greenhouse Studios, then moved work on the album to England as well as Kerzner's Sonic Reality studios in Miami.

== Promotion ==
Promotion of the album began in December 2012 with the release of a video teaser along with an introduction of the band to the press. In March 2013, the band opened for Marillion during their "Marillion Weekend" in Montreal, Quebec, playing a number of songs from Dimensionaut for the first time in front of a live audience. In April 2013, a video was released that featured excerpts from Dimensionaut. Six days prior to the release of Dimensionaut in Europe, a music video for the album's first single, "Not Coming Down," went public. The official music video for the album's second single, "Pale Blue Dot," premiered January 2014 at the USA Today website and was released worldwide March 2014.

A 2014 Dimensionaut tour, announced in March, began the following month with a concert in Los Angeles. As part of the tour, Sound of Contact performed during both the Moody Blues Cruise and Cruise to the Edge events in April 2014 and also made several television appearances that month. The tour concluded during May 2014 in Copenhagen, Denmark.

== Critical reception ==
Carys Jones of Entertainment Focus gave Dimensionaut four out of five stars. Her review stated, "The album is full of interesting takes and quirks...this album is wonderful in that it is truly experimental and the band have amazing talent as musicians". Along with the praise, however, Jones also stated in regard to the song Omega Point, "...the song sounds like the main reason of it was to make the ending words of every line rhyme, without paying too much attention to the body of the lyrics, its not our favourite song on the album...".

== Track listing ==
No.	Title	Writer(s)	Length
1.	"Sound of Contact"	Simon Collins, Dave Kerzner	2:05
2.	"Cosmic Distance Ladder" (Instrumental)	Collins, Matt Dorsey, Kerzner, Kelly Nordstrom	4:44
3.	"Pale Blue Dot"	Collins, Dorsey, Kerzner, Nordstrom	4:44
4.	"I Am (Dimensionaut)"	Collins, Kerzner, Nordstrom	6:25
5.	"Not Coming Down"	Collins, Kerzner, Gene Barnett Siegel	6:01
6.	"Remote View"	Collins, Kerzner, Nordstrom	3:54
7.	"Beyond Illumination"	Collins, Kerzner, Nordstrom, Hannah Stobart	5:53
8.	"Only Breathing Out"	Collins, Kerzner, Nordstrom	5:57
9.	"Realm of In-Organic Beings" (Instrumental)	Collins, Kerzner	2:53
10.	"Closer to You"	Collins, Dorsey, Kerzner	5:05
11.	"Omega Point"	Collins, Dorsey, Kerzner, Nordstrom	6:30
12.	"Möbius Slip: Part One: In the Difference Engine (Instrumental); Part Two: Perihelion Continuum; Part Three: Salvation Found; Part Four: All Worlds All Times"	Collins, Dorsey, Kerzner, Nordstrom	19:36
Total length:			73:46

== Personnel ==
Sound of Contact

- Simon Collins – lead vocals, drums, percussion
- Matt Dorsey – electric guitars, acoustic guitars, bass guitars, backing vocals
- Dave Kerzner – keyboards, acoustic guitars, backing vocals
- Kelly Nordstrom – electric guitars, acoustic guitars, bass guitars

Additional personnel

- Hannah Stobart – vocals on track 7
- Wells Cunningham – cello on tracks 1, 5, 7, 10, and 11

== Production ==
- Produced by Simon Collins and Dave Kerzner
- Recorded by Chris "Hollywood" Holmes and Mixed by Nick Davis
- Mastered by Gavin Lurssen and Reuben Cohen
