= Shelby Logan Warne =

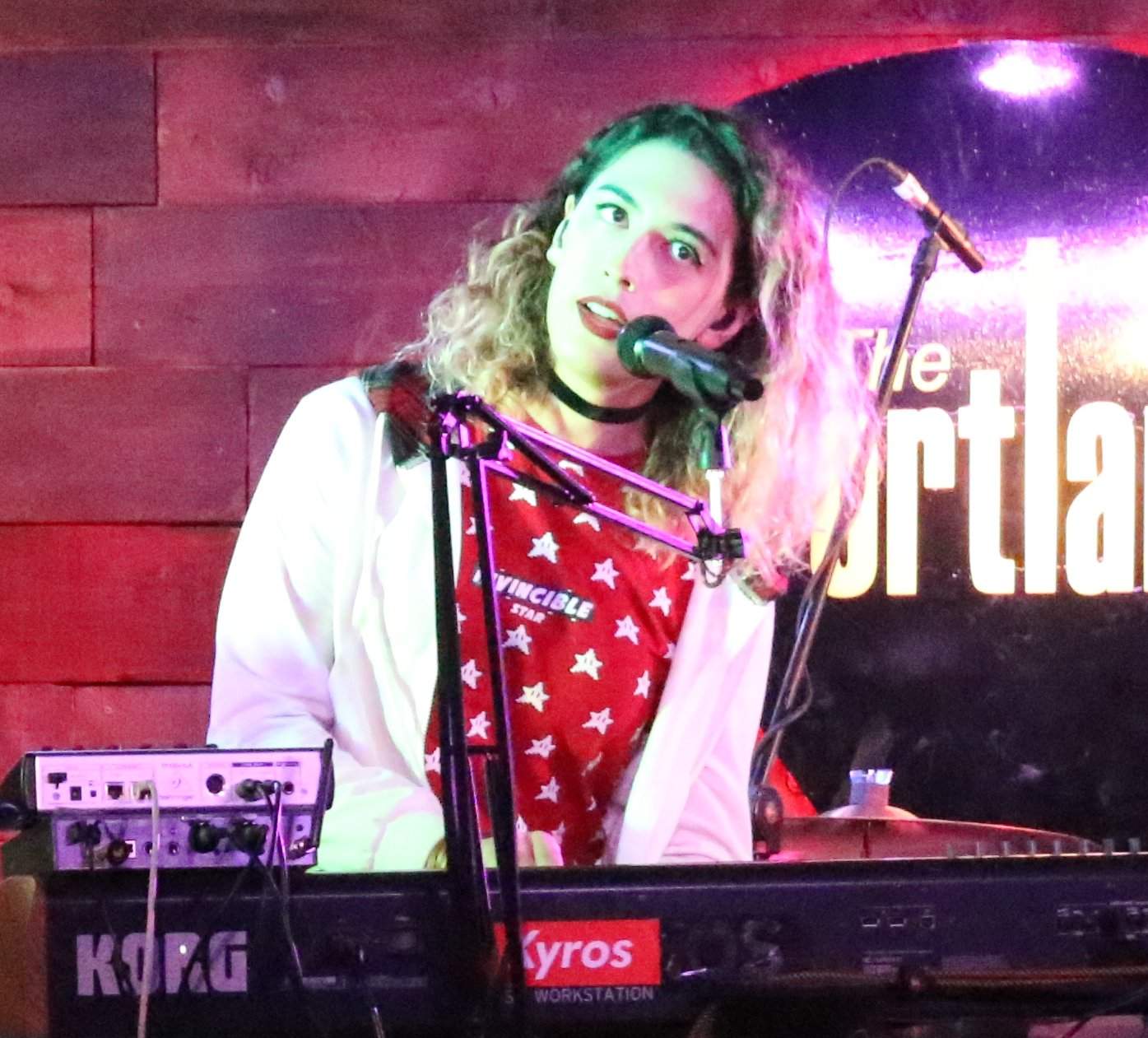
- Warne live with Kyros in 2021
- Born: 30 August 1993 (age 32); London, England
- Occupations: Musician; studio engineer; music and video producer; graphic designer; CG artist; songwriter; singer
- Title: Co-owner and director of Sensible Music
- Musical career
- Genres: Alternative rock, progressive rock, pop, electronic
- Instruments: Vocals; keyboards; bass guitar; drums
- Years active: 2010–present
- Member of: Kyros; Circuline
- Website: shelbyloganwarne.com

Shelby Logan Warne (formerly Adam Warne; born 30 August 1993) is a British music producer, audio engineer, multi-instrumentalist, songwriter, visual artist and video producer who is the lead vocalist and keyboard player of the alternative and progressive rock group, Kyros.

== Biography ==
Warne was born in Carshalton in 1993 at St Helier Hospital and grew up in Wimbledon, London. She lived for three years in north London whilst undergoing an undergraduate course in BA Popular Music studies at Middlesex University between 2011 and 2014. Prior to this, Warne attended the BRIT School of Performing Arts and Technology under the Music strand and graduated with a BTEC Level 3 Extended Diploma in Music in 2011. She now lives in Hoxton, London and as of 2024, alongside multi-instrumentalist, musician and journalist Grace Hayhurst, Warne is the co-owner and managing director of Sensible Music Ltd in King's Cross, London, having taken over from founder and former owner, Jeff Allen.

Raised by an English father and Thai mother, Warne is a native English speaker and fluent in the Thai language.

Warne is a transgender woman. She publicly came out in 2021.

== Audio engineering and Sensible Music Ltd ==
After parting ways with recording label, Giant Electric Pea in 2015, Warne and the rest of the members of Kyros took the decision to independently produce and release the album, 'Vox Humana' after forming their independent management company, Kyros Media Group. Leaving behind the production efforts of Michael Holmes and Rob Aubrey at Giant Electric Pea, Warne took over mixing and production duties at her then home studio in Wimbledon. Mixing was completed in early 2016. After years of mixing practice and working on future Kyros material, Warne took the decision to bring her mixes forward as a showreel. In 2018 Warne landed a position at the Hoxton-based, Old Street Studios where she worked as an assistant. That same year she was promoted to in-house engineer. By 2022, Warne was the studio manager and head engineer.

In late 2023 Shelby ended her time at Old Street Studios as paperwork began to finalise for the takeover of ownership for Sensible Music Ltd following Jeff Allen's retirement. Completion and handover was performed in April 2024 and since then the complex has undergone extensive refurbishment and renovation with construction of additional control rooms and facilities.

Warne works primarily on Solid State Logic consoles utilising a hybrid mixing approach with a combination of analogue outboard equipment and 'in the box' software

== Formation of KYROS ==
Having gone through a number of incarnations, Kyros dates back to 2009 as a solo music project under the working title of Chromology. Warne had begun her experimentation with songwriting whilst undergoing her studies at The BRIT School for Performing Arts and Technology.

In 2010, Warne began writing towards what would eventually become Kyros' debut album under the then name of Synaesthesia. In 2012, she joined in collaboration with fellow Middlesex University student Nikolas Jon Aarland, who helped record guitar parts. Nikolas was involved in the recording process of the early demos but left the project in 2013 soon after his parts were re-recorded at Aubitt Studios for the GEP release of the album. This was due to his ongoing work with a number of other projects. He was replaced with guitarist, Ollie Hannifan who helped record a number of the remaining guitar parts for the album as well as contributions from IQ guitarist, Michael Holmes.

Under the band name of Synaesthesia, Warne signed a recording deal with Giant Electric Pea in February 2012 and promptly started the recording process at Aubitt Studios in Southampton for the debut album with IQ guitarist and Giant Electric Pea CEO, Michael Holmes as record producer and Rob Aubrey as recording engineer. The album was recorded through the process of multi-track recording and overdubbing as all the instruments with the exception of bass guitar and electric guitar were performed by Warne. Guitar duties were taken care of by Ollie Hannifan, Nikolas Jon Aarland and minor edits and re-recordings by Michael Holmes. Bass duties were taken care of by Michael Holmes with the exception of Nikolas on the track, Technology Killed The Kids.

Once the recording of the album had finished, Warne began the process of completing the band line-up for future albums and live purposes. She welcomed second guitarist, Samuel Higgins whom she had also met through university, along with drummer, Robin Johnson via an online forum and bassist, Peter Episcopo via recording engineer, Rob Aubrey, into the band with Warne taking care of vocals, synths and keyboard duties from then on.

Kyros's debut album was released originally a self-titled work as the band was under the name of Synaesthesia at the time. The album was released 20 January 2014.

The band performed their debut concert at The Cultuurpodium Boerderij in Zoetermeer supporting IQ.

Kyros went onto welcoming American guitarist Joey Frevola into the band replacing Ollie Hannifan in 2014 and have since parted ways from GEP and independently release their second album, Vox Humana in November 2016.

The band signed on White Star Records to release their third album, Celexa Dreams in June 2020 and fourth album, Mannequin in February 2024.

== Influences ==
Warne has stated a number of influences ranging from progressive rock staples to mainstream pop music producers as well as many notable acts such as Trevor Horn, Genesis, Phil Collins, Tony Banks, Muse, Matt Bellamy, Porcupine Tree, Steven Wilson, Dream Theater, Spock's Beard, Neal Morse, Rush, Flying Colors, Mike Portnoy, IQ, Haken, Keane, Kevin Gilbert, Frost*, Transatlantic, Poppy, Cardiacs, Tim Smith, Savant/Aleksander Vinter, Simon Godfrey, Marillion, Chvrches, HAIM and Tears for Fears.

== Discography ==
=== With KYROS ===
Studio albums

- Synaesthesia (2014)
- Vox Humana (2016)
- Celexa Dreams (2020)
- Celexa Streams (2021)
- RECOVER (2021)
- Mannequin (2024)

EPs and singles

- BETA EP (2015)
- "Cloudburst" maxi single (2016)
- Monster EP (2017)
- Four of Fear (2020)

== Other credits ==
=== Engineering credits ===
- KYROS - Vox Humana (recording & mixing / 2016)
- Shahin Najafi - Jens Sevom (mixing / 2019)
- Edge of Reality - In Static (mixing / 2019)
- Bogus Gasman - Don't Get Your Hopes Up (recording & mixing / 2019)
- KYROS - Celexa Dreams (recording & mixing / 2020)
- KYROS - RECOVER (mixing / 2021)
- Hotdoggrrrl & the Sesame Buns - The Beginning Of The End (mixing / 2021)
- KYROS - Mannequin (recording & mixing / 2024)

=== Video production and film making credits ===
- Steven Wilson - "Live at HMV 363 Oxford Street, London" (unplugged gig / filming & sound editing/mastering in collaboration with Crystal Spotlight / 2017)
- Steven Wilson - "fan event in Shoreditch, London" (social media video content / filming & editing in collaboration with Crystal Spotlight / 2017)
- Steven Wilson - To The Bone Tour Mini-Doc (mini-documentary / filming & editing in collaboration with Crystal Spotlight / 2018)
- Bullet Height - Break Our Heart Down (lyric video / CG animation & editing / 2018)
- Lines in the Sky - Thalassophobia (lyric video / CG animation & editing / 2019)
- Ihlo - Reanimate (music video / CG animation & editing / 2019)
- Iamthemorning - Song of Psyche (music video / CG animation & editing / 2019)
- Mariana Semkina - Still Life (music video / directing, filming, animation and editing / 2020)
- KYROS - In Motion (music video / directing, CG animation & editing / 2020)
- KYROS - Two Frames of Panic (music video / directing, CG animation & editing / 2020)
- KYROS - Fear of Fear (music video / directing, CG animation & editing / 2020)
- KYROS - Phosphene (music video / directing, CG animation & editing / 2020)
- Crusade - Insatiable (lyric video / directing, CG animation & editing / 2021)
