= Twelve-step Suite =

Composition by Dream Theater

Composition by Dream Theater
- Genre: Progressive metal; progressive rock
- Length: 57:13
- Composer: Dream Theater
- Lyricist: Mike Portnoy
- Producers: Mike Portnoy; John Petrucci

The Twelve-step Suite (also known as the Twelve-step Saga or Alcoholics Anonymous Suite) is a set of five songs by American progressive metal band Dream Theater. One song was featured on each Dream Theater studio album from Six Degrees of Inner Turbulence to Black Clouds & Silver Linings.

The lyrics to each song, written by the band's drummer Mike Portnoy, deal with his experience of alcoholism. Each song represents a certain number of the Twelve Steps. Various lyrical and musical themes run through the Suite. It was written by the band with the intention of eventually playing it live as one piece.

== Background ==
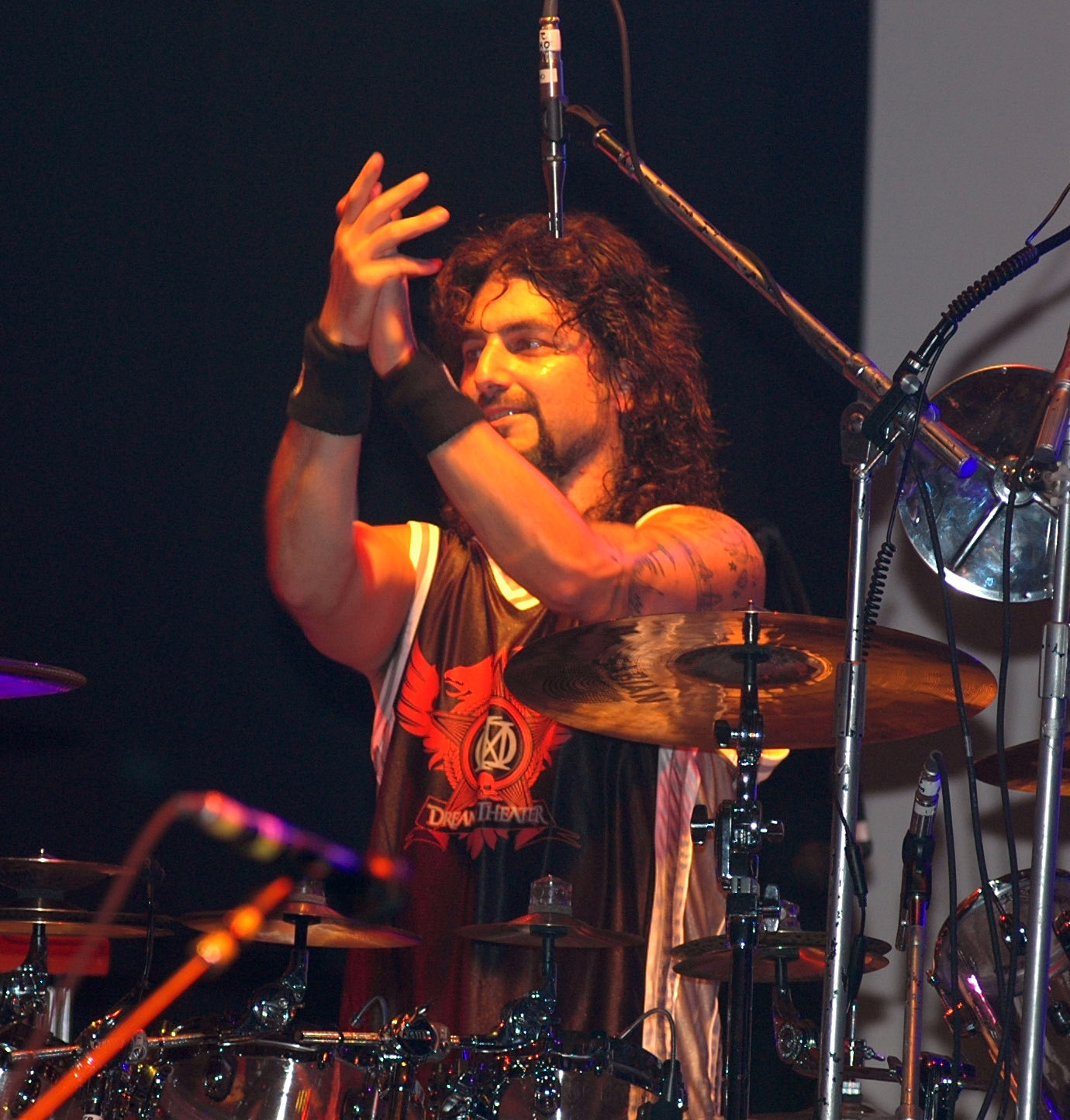
Mike Portnoy in 2007

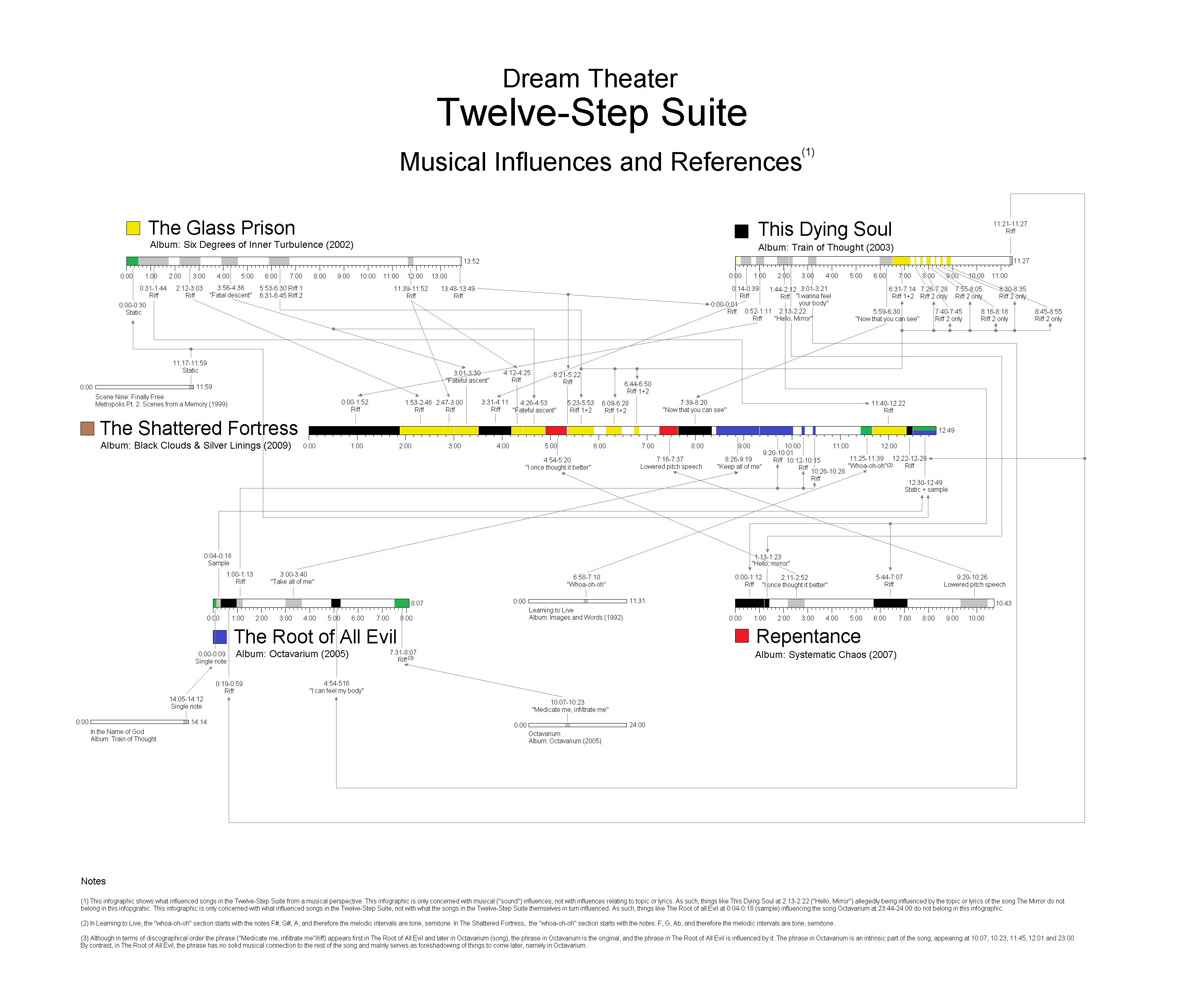
Twelve-step Suite musical influences and references

By the end of Dream Theater's tour to promote their 1999 studio album, Metropolis Pt. 2: Scenes from a Memory, Mike Portnoy considered his alcoholism and drug abuse to have gone out of control:

For so many years ... I would never let my drinking and partying get in the way of my playing or my work with the band ... For fifteen years straight I drank and drugged every single day. But it was always kind of responsible and was always at the end of the night ... As time went on, I would start to have my first couple of drinks before the encore – Then Jose [Baraquio, Portnoy's then-drum technician] started giving me drinks in the keyboard solo in the middle of the show ... Towards the end, I was drinking earlier in the day while the opening band were on, and I would get onstage already half-crocked.

Portnoy went through periods of using other drugs, including marijuana, prescription drugs, and cocaine, though he considered alcohol to be his "drug of choice". Bandmate James LaBrie noted that Portnoy was "drinking like a fish"; his drinking had become a source of tension within the band. Portnoy consumed his final alcoholic drink on April 20, 2000 (his thirty-third birthday) after the final show on Dream Theater's Scenes from a Memory tour. He found the Alcoholics Anonymous twelve-step program (which he considers to have "saved his life"), and made it a priority to attend meetings while touring.

Portnoy's struggle with alcohol was previously the subject of "The Mirror", a song from Dream Theater's 1994 album Awake. After he stopped drinking, Portnoy decided to write a suite of tracks describing the twelve-step program which would span several albums. He views the Suite as a concept album spread over five releases. Portnoy started with an initial lyrical idea for the entire Suite, but musically the band "approached it fresh" when writing each track. The Suite was planned as something which would eventually be performed live in its entirety. All songs are dedicated to "Bill W. and his friends".

Portnoy described the process of writing the tracks as "very therapeutic". Upon finishing the Suite in 2009, however, he reflected that he had "dug [himself] into a hole with it. It was a nice idea seven years ago. ... After a while it became like an obligation hanging over my head, like a homework assignment". He said that he "didn't know if [he] would have done it" had he known how large the Suite would grow: "If I had realized what I was getting myself into five albums ago ... I think maybe I would have written one song that encompassed all twelve steps".

Before leaving Dream Theater in 2010, Portnoy had planned to play the Twelve-step Suite in its entirety following the Black Clouds & Silver Linings tour. He intentionally reserved "The Shattered Fortress" for this tour. He said that it would "break his heart" if Dream Theater was to perform the Suite without him. In May 2014, during an interview for Eddie Trunk’s "Trunk Nation", Portnoy commented on the outcome of American heavy metal band Queensrÿche’s feud (which resulted in the band's ex-vocalist Geoff Tate retaining the rights to the albums Operation: Mindcrime and Operation: Mindcrime II) and said that he would like to have done the same with his Suite when leaving Dream Theater.

Later Portnoy toured with musicians from Haken, playing the suite in its entirety.

== Songs ==
=== "The Glass Prison" ===
"The Glass Prison" contains the first three parts of the Suite ("Reflection", "Restoration", and "Revelation"). It is the first track on 2002's Six Degrees of Inner Turbulence and is the longest track of the "Twelve-step Suite". Rich Wilson (author of Dream Theater's official biography, Lifting Shadows) describes the track as a "clattering mass of riffs and shredding that finds Dream Theater at their most grinding". The weekend before entering the studio to start work on Six Degrees of Inner Turbulence, John Petrucci and Portnoy saw Pantera perform at the Hammerstein Ballroom, New York City. This provided a great influence on the band. Portnoy described the track as musically "this total Pantera-meets-Megadeth, relentless ball of energy".

=== "This Dying Soul" ===
"This Dying Soul" features parts four and five of the Suite ("Reflections of Reality (Revisited)" and "Release"). It is the second track on 2003's Train of Thought. Wilson describes the track as a lyrical and musical continuation of "The Glass Prison".

The song also contains some lyrical references to the band's song "The Mirror", most notably the opening lines, "Hello mirror/so glad to see you my friend/it's been a while". The lyric also references their song "Regression", which includes the lyric "Hello Victoria, so glad to see you, my friend". Also, the first section's title, "Reflections of Reality (Revisited)", references the line "Reflections of reality are slowly coming into view". The line "Now it's time to stare the problem right between the eyes" is similar to the line from "The Mirror", "Let's stare the problem right in the eye". The second section ("Release") of this song opens with the same riff as the second part ("Restoration") of "The Glass Prison".

=== "The Root of All Evil" ===
"The Root of All Evil" consists of parts six and seven of the Suite ("Ready" and "Remove"). It is the opening track on 2005's Octavarium and the shortest track in the Suite. Portnoy considers it to be "an archetypal Dream Theater track, tidily mixing heavy riffs with some progressive moments".

=== "Repentance" ===
"Repentance" features parts eight and nine of the Suite ("Regret" and "Restitution"). It is the fifth track on 2007's Systematic Chaos. By this stage, Portnoy had been sober for seven years. Portnoy stated that it was intentionally conceived as "a bit more of a breather", as the previous songs in the Suite had been "so aggressive and bombastic". He said that of all the tracks on Systematic Chaos, he was particularly proud of "Repentance" because it was "a moody, dark song, hypnotic, psychedelic ... something that we’ve never done before". He described "Restitution" as having a "spacey, Pink Floyd feel". James LaBrie considered the challenge of "being able to really convey that message, but with the proper character" on "Repentance" to be the hardest part of his performance on Systematic Chaos: "I wanted it to come off sounding very somber, very serious, very ... not cold, but a somber approach, you know".

Portnoy described the ninth part of the Suite, "Restitution", as being "all about making amends to people you’ve harmed". When writing it, he did not want to write about his own personal life as it would have made the song "too specific" to himself, wanting to make the lyrics more general. He instead asked friends of the band to contribute spoken word apologies. Steve Hogarth, Steven Wilson, Steve Vai, Joe Satriani, Mikael Åkerfeldt, Corey Taylor, Daniel Gildenlöw, Neal Morse, David Ellefson, and Chris Jericho all contributed apologies which featured in the final track, while Jon Anderson delivered a "melodic mantra". Portnoy was disappointed that Dave Mustaine, Geoff Tate, Bruce Dickinson and James Hetfield declined his invitation, but was pleased with the final list of contributors.

=== "The Shattered Fortress" ===
"The Shattered Fortress" concludes the Suite, featuring the last three parts ("Restraint", "Receive", "Responsible"). It is the fourth track on 2009's Black Clouds & Silver Linings. Portnoy considers the track as the Suite's "grand finale" and "knew it would really be made up of all the musical and lyrical references from the past, and bring them all together to wrap it all up". Before starting to write the track, the band listened to all four of the previous tracks in the Suite, making notes on the progressions of the parts and the melodies they wanted to reprise.

== Track listing ==
All lyrics are written by Mike Portnoy; all music is composed by John Petrucci, John Myung, Jordan Rudess, and Mike Portnoy (except "The Root of All Evil" and "Repentance," composed by Dream Theater).

No.	Title	Original album	Length
1.	"The Glass Prison": "I. Reflection"; "II. Restoration"; "III. Revelation"	Six Degrees of Inner Turbulence	13:52
2.	"This Dying Soul": "IV. Reflections of Reality (Revisited)"; "V. Release"	Train of Thought	11:27
3.	"The Root of All Evil": "VI. Ready"; "VII. Remove"	Octavarium	8:25
4.	"Repentance": "VIII. Regret"; "IX. Restitution"	Systematic Chaos	10:43
5.	"The Shattered Fortress": "X. Restraint"; "XI. Receive"; "XII. Responsible"	Black Clouds & Silver Linings	12:49
Total length:			57:16

== Personnel ==
Dream Theater

- James LaBrie – lead vocals
- John Myung – bass
- John Petrucci – guitar, backing vocals, producer
- Mike Portnoy – drums, backing vocals, co-lead vocals, spoken word on "Repentance" and "The Shattered Fortress", producer
- Jordan Rudess – keyboards

Guest spoken words on "Repentance"

- Corey Taylor
- Steve Vai
- Chris Jericho
- David Ellefson
- Daniel Gildenlöw
- Steve Hogarth
- Joe Satriani
- Mikael Åkerfeldt
- Steven Wilson
- Jon Anderson
- Neal Morse

Production

- Doug Oberkircher – engineer
- Paul Northfield – engineer

== Bibliography ==
- Wilson, Rich (2009). Lifting Shadows: The Authorized Biography of Dream Theater (Classic ed.). London: Essential Works. ISBN 978-1-906615-02-4.
