= Synaesthesia (Kyros album) =

Studio album by Kyros
- Released: January 2014
- Recorded: 2013
- Genres: Progressive rock, Alternative rock
- Length: 52:00
- Label: Giant Electric Pea
- Producer: Michael Holmes

Kyros chronology
Synaesthesia (2014)	Vox Humana (2016)

Professional ratings
Review scores
Source	Rating
ProgArchives	4/5 stars

Synaesthesia is the 2014 debut album by British progressive and alternative rock band Kyros. The album was produced by IQ guitarist Michael Holmes. All music on Synaesthesia was written originally as a solo studio project by multi-instrumentalist and vocalist Shelby Logan Warne, with contributions from fellow Middlesex University attendee, guitarist Nikolas Jon Aarland and further contributions from guitarist, Ollie Hannifan.

The album was originally a self-titled release as Kyros were originally known as Synaesthesia.

== Publicity and reception ==
Synaesthesia was released to critical acclaim having received a number of shining reviews from a variety of sources. The band have also since had a number of features and appearances in Classic Rock Magazine subsidiary, "Prog Magazine" with articles written by respected journalists, Malcolm Dome and Rich Wilson. The track 'Epiphany' also features on the free CD for issue 43 of the publication. The band's debut album has also received positive reviews from ProgArchives, Classic Rock Magazine, Dutch Progressive Rock Pages and Eclipsed Magazine.

Much to the band's surprise considering the debut album had not yet been released. In January 2014, issue 42 of Classic Rock Magazine presents Prog announced that Synaesthesia had come first place in their reader's poll for 'Tip for 2014'.

== Artwork ==
The album features artwork by Freyja Dean, daughter of the respected artist Roger Dean. Freyja Dean created a large format piece of artwork using a mixture of ballpoint pen and water colour based on the inspiration of the word, Synaesthesia

The original Synaesthesia logo was also created by Dean at the same point, hand-drawn utilising black ballpoint pen.

== Track listing ==
Synaesthesia
No.	Title	Writer(s)	Length
1.	"Time, Tension & Intervention": "I. The Big Freeze"; "II. An Excursion"; "III. Past"; "IV. Present"; "V. Future"	Shelby Logan Warne, Nikolas Jon Aarland	22:11
2.	"Sacrifice"	Warne	5:32
3.	"Noumenon"	Warne, Nikolas Jon Aarland	3:38
4.	"Epiphany"	Warne	6:51
5.	"Good Riddance"	Warne	3:32
6.	"'Technology Killed The Kids"	Warne	3:03
7.	"Life's What You Make of It": "I. Tomorrow"; "II. Life's What You Make of It"	Warne	7:29

== Personnel ==
- Shelby Logan Warne – sequencing, lead vocals, drums, percussion, synthesisers
- Nikolas Jon Aarland– guitar, bass guitar, backing vocals
- Ollie Hannifan – guitar

Additional credits

- Michael Holmes – Producing, additional electric guitars
- Rob Aubrey – recording, mixing, mastering
- Freyja Dean – artwork
