= U-Catastrophe =

Studio album by Simon Collins
- Released: 2008
- Recorded: 2007–2008
- Genre: Rock, synth-metal
- Label: Razor & Tie
- Producer: Kevin Churko & Simon Collins

Simon Collins chronology
Time for Truth (2005)	U-Catastrophe (2008)	Becoming Human (2020)

Singles from U-Catastrophe
- 1. "Unconditional" Released: 2008; 2. "Powerless" Released: 2008

U-Catastrophe is the third album by British-Canadian musician and singer-songwriter Simon Collins, son of Phil Collins. Phil plays on the track "The Big Bang", while another former Genesis member, Steve Hackett, plays on the track "Fast Forward the Future". It was first digitally available in August 2008 on iTunes.

== Production ==
While recording a cover of the 1981 Genesis song "Keep It Dark" in 2007, Collins met Canadian record producer Kevin Churko. As a result of the meeting, they decided to produce Collins' next album together. That same year Collins signed with the record label Razor & Tie. Work began on the album in September 2007, finishing in February 2008.

== Theme and highlights ==
Collins recounts that much of the album as well as the album's title were inspired by events in his own life, stating, "I went through some hard times a couple years ago and I had to find a way back to love and a way back to living a life that I knew was healthy for me. There were certain things I felt a need to sing about, so a lot of these songs were inspired by my own personal u-catastrophe.". "Us (Love Transcends)" is according to Collins "one of the most personal songs on the record" and was written for his partner and stepdaughter. Collins has also related that songs on the album such as "Disappearing" and "Eco" are his response to the global warming issue: "I know everyone's sick of hearing about it but it's not gonna go away."

Collins' father, Phil Collins, appears on the track "The Big Bang" in a drum duet between the two. This appearance marks what the elder Collins has called his final drum track as health issues have since made drumming too difficult and painful for him. In his memoir Not Dead Yet, Phil recalls studio techs needing to tape drumsticks to his weak hands to allow him to record. Former Genesis guitarist Steve Hackett contributed to the final track, "Fast Forward the Future".

== Reception ==
Musicplayers.com wrote in their review of the album, "There is definite greatness here. On the drumming front, Simon shares style and tone with his dad, but he goes far more in a modern rock direction with programming electronic beats and grooves."

The album's first single "Unconditional" reached the Canadian Hot 100 in November 2008.

== Track listing ==
No.	Title	Writer(s)	Length
1.	"U-Catastrophe"	Simon Collins, Kevin Churko	5:24
2.	"All I've Left to Lose"	Collins, Churko	3:07
3.	"Disappearing"	Collins, Churko	4:20
4.	"Powerless"	Collins, Churko	3:38
5.	"Go (Only One I Know)"	Collins	4:26
6.	"The Good Son"	Collins, Churko, Kelly Nordstrom	4:54
7.	"Unconditional"	Collins	3:39
8.	"The Big Bang"	Collins, Churko, Dave "Squids" Kerzner	5:54
9.	"Eco"	Collins, Churko, Debora Lucyk	5:11
10.	"Us (Love Transcends)"	Collins	4:21
11.	"Between I & E"	Collins	5:02
12.	"Fast Forward the Future"	Collins	6:34
Total length:			56:30

== Personnel ==
- Simon Collins – vocals, keyboards (1–6, 8–12), acoustic piano (1, 5, 6, 9, 10), sound design (1–6, 8–12), drums (1, 2, 4–9), guitars (3), sampler (9), additional guitars (11), drum programming (12)
- Dave Kerzner – additional keyboards (1, 6), sound design (1, 3, 4, 6, 8), keyboards (3, 4, 8)
- Brian Dillman – sound design (4), additional sound design (6, 9)
- Debora Lucyk – sampler (9), additional sound design (9), backing vocals (9), chanting (9)
- Kevin Churko – guitars, bass, backing vocals (1–7, 9–12), keyboards (3–10), drum programming (3, 12), strings (9), drums (11)
- Kelly Nordstrom – guitars (1, 6, 8, 10, 11, 12), additional guitars (2–5, 9)
- Steve Hackett – guitar solo (12)
- Phil Collins – drums (8)

== Production ==
- Simon Collins – producer
- Kevin Churko – producer, recording, mixing, mastering
- Michael Caplan – A&R
- Greg Martin – artwork, design
- Joseph Cultice – photography
- Alan Wolmark – management
- Recorded at Kung Fu Studios (Las Vegas, Nevada, USA) and MAP Studios (Twickenham, England, UK).
- Mixed at Kung Fu Studios
- Mastered at Armoury Studios (Vancouver, British Columbia, Canada).

== See also ==
- Sound of Contact
- Dimensionaut
