= All of Who You Are =

Studio album by Simon Collins
- Released: 1999 (original); 2000 (re-release)
- Recorded: 1998
- Genre: Electronic
- Label: Warner Music
- Producer: Schallbau and Simon Collins

Simon Collins chronology
All of Who You Are (1999)	Time for Truth (2005)

Singles from All of Who You Are
- 1. "Pride" Released: 23 August 1999; 2. "Money Maker" Released: 2000; 3. "Shine Through" Released: 2000

All of Who You Are is the debut solo studio album by Simon Collins, son of Phil Collins.

== Track listing ==
=== Original release ===
1. "All of Who You Are" – 4:58
2. "Pride" – 5:36
3. "Money Maker" – 5:16
4. "Anymore" – 4:31
5. "Coast" – 5:49
6. "Ocean Deep Inside" – 5:36
7. "Sphere" – 5:45
8. "In My Life" – 5:45
9. "Jaded" – 4:44
10. "These Dreams" – 4:45
11. "Light Years Away" – 6:27

=== Re-release ===
1. "All of Who You Are" – 4:58
2. "Pride" – 5:36
3. "Money Maker" – 5:16
4. "Anymore" – 4:31
5. "Coast" – 5:49
6. "Ocean Deep Inside" – 5:36
7. "Shine Through" – 3:35
8. "Sphere" – 5:45
9. "In My Life" – 5:45
10. "Jaded" – 4:44
11. "These Dreams" – 4:45
12. "Light Years Away" – 6:27
