= Pride (Simon Collins song) =

1999 single by Simon Collins

Single by Simon Collins

from the album All of Who You Are
- Released: 23 August 1999
- Genre: Progressive rock, pop
- Length: 3:46 (radio edit); 5:36 (album version)
- Label: Warner
- Songwriters: A.C. Boutsen; Simon Collins
- Producers: Schallbau; Simon Collins

Simon Collins singles chronology
"Pride" (1999)	"Money Maker" (2000)

"Pride" is a song by British-Canadian artist Simon Collins. It was released in August 1999 as the lead single from his debut album, All of Who You Are, and was a top 40 hit in Germany, where it peaked at No. 31, and also reached No. 41 in Canada.

== Background ==
The song was inspired by the film Braveheart and "the concept of a man losing everything to be left only with his pride" and also alludes to Collins' bisexuality. Discussing the song in a 2005 interview, Collins stated "I was using that inspiration to write a song about not being afraid to step outside of the box or the closet and be the fuck who [sic] you want to be and don’t ever apologize for it". His father Phil Collins sings backing vocals on the track.

== Music video ==
The video was filmed in the Cape Town suburb of Observatory.

== Tracklisting ==
CD maxi - Germany (1999)

1. "Pride" (Album Version) - 5:36
2. "Pride" (B-Zet Mix) - 5:09
3. "Pride" (Club Sonic Mix) - 6:35
4. "Pride" (Radio Edit) - 3:46
5. "Light Years Away" (Album Version) - 6:27

== Charts ==
Chart (1999)	Peak Position
Canada Top Singles (RPM)	41
Germany (GfK)	31
