= Simon Collins =

British-Canadian musician (born 1976)

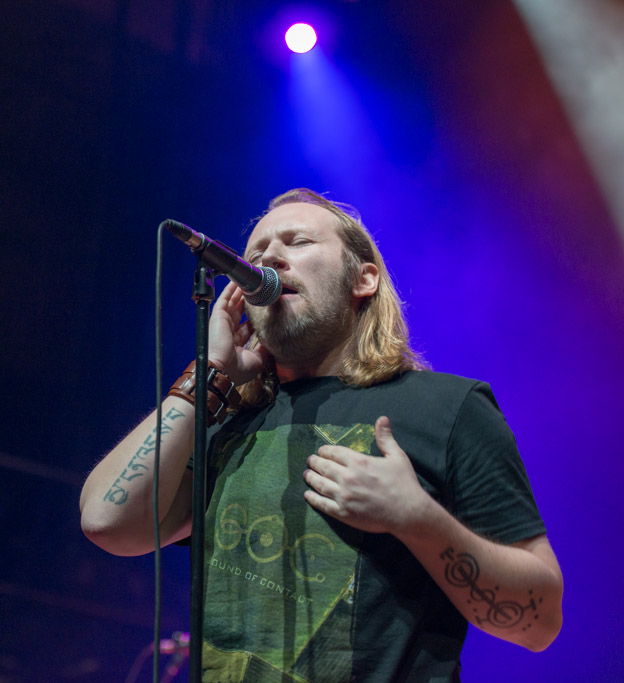
- Collins performing with Sound of Contact in 2013

Background information
- Born: Simon Philip Nando Collins; 14 September 1976 (age 50); Hammersmith, London, England
- Origin: Vancouver, British Columbia, Canada
- Genres: Progressive rock; pop; electronic
- Occupation: Musician
- Instruments: Drums; vocals
- Years active: 1998–present
- Formerly of: Sound of Contact
- Website: simoncollinsmusic.com

Simon Philip Nando Collins (born 14 September 1976) is a British drummer and the former lead vocalist of the progressive rock band Sound of Contact. He is the son of Phil Collins. Reviewers have compared his vocals to those of his father.

== Early life ==
Collins was born in Hammersmith, London. He is the eldest son of singer/drummer Phil Collins and his first wife, Andrea Bertorelli. He moved to Vancouver, Canada in 1984, when he was eight years old, after his parents' divorce. He lived with his mother, Andrea, and his sister, Joely, in nearby Richmond between the ages of eight and eleven. In September 1987, they moved into an estate purchased in Vancouver's Shaughnessy neighbourhood with assistance from his father, a decision described by Andrea Collins as a means to a better education for Collins and his sister and for the sake of other lifestyle considerations. In 1991, his parents were involved in a court battle at the Supreme Court of British Columbia to gain possession of the estate, owing to a misunderstanding of the terms of ownership of the home. His father had previously placed the estate in an irrevocable land trust in 1987, however, to be owned by both children jointly in adulthood. His father succeeded in retaining control of the estate until Simon's twentieth birthday, as the judge ruled in October 1991 he was not old enough to sign his half of the estate to his mother as she had intended. Collins completed his secondary education at Vancouver's Point Grey Secondary School.

Collins first became involved with music when he was five after his father purchased for him a Tama drum kit. He practised drumming by playing along with music albums in his parents' record collection as well as when accompanying his father while on tour with Genesis. Collins' experiences on tour allowed him to be mentored by his father and by the band's touring drummer, Chester Thompson. Though he had a percussion instructor when he was ten, Collins preferred drumming to artists such as Stewart Copeland, Gavin Harrison, and Keith Moon over his formal lessons in jazz drumming. Simon made his first onstage appearance alongside his father at the age of 12, performing drums on "Easy Lover." He also appeared onstage for a performance during the Seriously, Live! World Tour.

In his early teens, Collins learned to play the piano and began to develop songwriting and singing skills. While he played drums in numerous hard rock bands beginning at age 14, Collins wanted to pursue singing, songwriting, and diversity in music styles, including pop, progressive rock, rock and roll, punk, grunge, and electronica. According to Collins, he did not wish to spend his life "drumming to other people's music." His early compositions were rejected by the heavier rock bands he played for because of their pop style.

In his late teens, Collins worked part-time as a disc jockey in Vancouver's rave scene. His experiences in rave culture inspired a collaborative documentary project with his sister Joely called Summer Love.

Collins developed a passion for astronomy and social issues during his youth, and frequently revisits these themes in his music.

== Career ==
=== Solo career and collaborations ===
Prior to the beginning of his solo career, Collins was a member of the local punk band Jet Set. Collins was signed by Warner Music Group following a release of demo tapes he had recorded in 2000. It was at this time that Collins moved from Vancouver to Frankfurt, Germany, where his debut album All of Who You Are was released. The album saw 100,000 copies sold in Germany and three singles were released off it: "Pride", "Money Maker" and "Shine Through". The album's sales have been attributed to the success of the single, "Pride." A second single, "Shine Through", was co-written by Collins and Howard Jones.

In 2003, Collins left Warner Music and returned to Vancouver to start his own record label, Lightyears Music. On the Lightyears label two years later, Collins released his second album, Time for Truth. He played a variety of instruments on the album in addition to providing the majority of the vocals. In 2007, he recorded a cover of Genesis' Abacab track "Keep It Dark," as a tribute to Genesis, with keyboardist and co-producer Dave Kerzner. During production of "Keep it Dark", Collins met Kevin Churko, who mixed and mastered the recording; Collins later had Churko work with him on the production of his third album, U-Catastrophe.

U-Catastrophe, released in 2008 on iTunes, became Collins' first North American recording project. The album's first single, "Unconditional", debuted on the Billboard Hot Adult Contemporary Tracks chart at No. 30 in September 2008. It later peaked at No. 12 on Billboard in November 2008 and charted on the Canadian Hot 100 in the same month. Kerzner, Kelly Nordstrom, and Steve Hackett were featured on "Fast Forward the Future"; Phil Collins appeared on "The Big Bang".

=== Sound of Contact ===
In late 2009, Collins approached Kerzner with the idea of forming a new band. After bringing the idea to musicians Matt Dorsey and Kelly Nordstrom, the four of them began working together at Greenhouse Studios in Vancouver. The band, known by December 2012 as Sound of Contact, included Collins on lead vocals and drums, Kerzner on keyboards, and Dorsey and Nordstrom sharing guitar and bass duties. The band's debut album, Dimensionaut, was released in May 2013. Soon after the release of Dimensionaut, Nordstrom left the band; Kerzner left in January 2014. Both rejoined the group in April 2015 and, subsequently, Sound of Contact began working on their second album.

Collins left Sound of Contact in 2018.

== Personal life ==
Collins is bisexual.

== Discography ==
=== Studio albums ===
- 1999: All of Who You Are
- 2005: Time for Truth
- 2008: U-Catastrophe
- 2020: Becoming Human

=== Singles ===
Year	Single	Peak chart positions			Album
Year	Single	CAN `	GER	US AC	Album
1999	"Pride"	41	31	—	All of Who You Are
2000	"Money Maker"	—	—	—	All of Who You Are
2000	"Shine Through"	—	75	—	All of Who You Are
2005	"Man on TV"	—	—	—	Time for Truth
2005	"Hold On"	—	—	—	Time for Truth
2008	"Unconditional"	99	—	12	U-Catastrophe
2008	"Powerless"	—	—	—	U-Catastrophe
2020	"Becoming Human"	—	—	—	Becoming Human
"—" denotes releases that did not chart

=== Sound of Contact ===
- 2013: Dimensionaut (with Dave Kerzner)

=== eMolecule ===
- 2023: The Architect (with Kelly Nordstrom)

=== With other artists ===
- 2012: Genesis Revisited II (with Steve Hackett)
