= Charlie Cawood =

English musician and music journalist

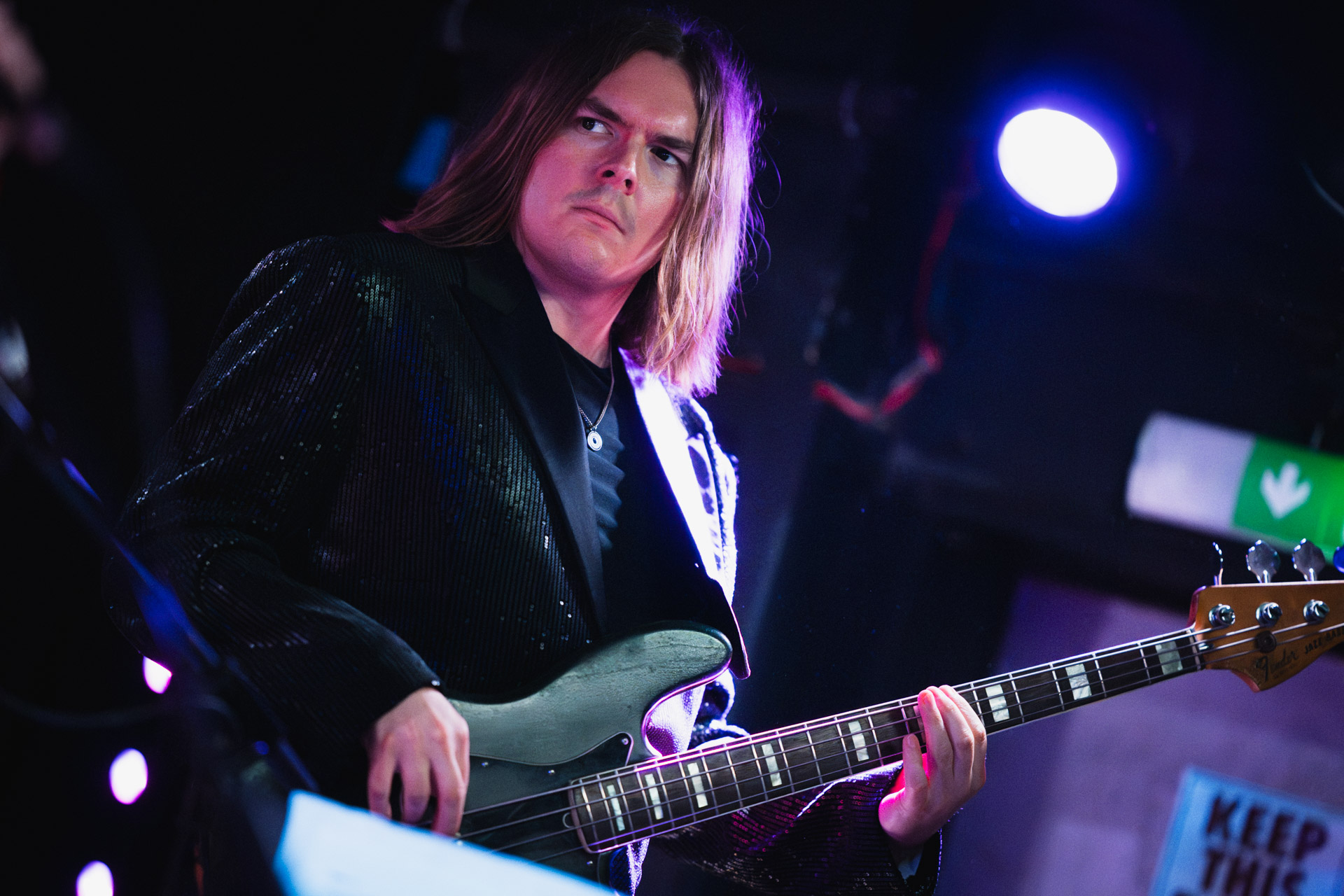
- Cawood with the Anchoress in 2025

Background information
- Born: Charles Dennis Cawood; 19 March 1988 (age 38); Barking, London, England
- Origin: Ilford, London, England
- Occupations: Musician; composer; music journalist
- Instruments: Guitar; bass guitar; keyboards; double bass; lute; sitar; shamisen; pipa; ruan; zhongruan; daruan; liuqin; oud; bağlama saz; bouzouki; tzouras; cittern; hammered dulcimer; zither; cuatro; lyre; harp; cümbüş; hurdy-gurdy; taishōgoto; gamelan
- Years active: 2005–present
- Label: Bad Elephant Music
- Member of: Knifeworld; Tonochrome; Opaz; Lost Crowns; Join the Din; Admirals Hard; The Smith and Drake Ensemble
- Formerly of: Achilla; Kyros
- Website: charliecawood.com

Charles Dennis Cawood (born 19 March 1988) is an English multi-instrumental musician, composer and music journalist, known for his (Note: Cawood uses the pronouns he/him and they/them. This article uses he/him for consistency.) cross-disciplinary musical skills as well as his work with a wide variety of projects and artists.

An active member of Kyros from 2023 to 2026, Lost Crowns, Knifeworld, Mediaeval Baebes, My Tricksy Spirit, Join the Din and Tonochrome (as well as a regular collaborator with The Anchoress), Cawood has worked in art rock, pop, folk and early music as well as Indian, Chinese and Balinese music and a variety of other forms. He has also released two solo albums of ensemble instrumental music. He played on Lucid, the 2014 solo album by The Fierce and the Dead guitarist Matt Stevens.

== Biography ==
=== Background and influences ===
While still a teenager, Cawood became interested in the music of other cultures. Learning flamenco guitar at Escuela de Baile, he also branched out into studying the music of India, China and Bali via the Asian Music Circuit, learning the sitar under Mehboob Nadeem and the Chinese pipa lute under Cheng Yu (leader of the UK Chinese Music Ensemble) during summer schools at the Royal Academy of Music).

Cawood graduated from both the Guitar Institute and the London Centre of Contemporary Music, gaining a Bachelor's degree in Popular Music Performance and Production. He went on to gain a Master's degree in Music Performance at SOAS, specialising in composition and in the music of East Asia and Southeast Asia).

Cawood plays around twenty different instruments. He regularly performs on guitar (acoustic, electric and nylon-string classical), bass guitar, sitar, zither, cuatro, cittern, hurdy-gurdy, lyre and lap harp as well as occasional keyboards, gamelan instruments and the taishōgoto (Nagoya harp). Cawood also specialises in a variety of lutes – the Greek bouzouki and tzouras; the Arabian oud; the Turkish cümbüş and bağlama (or saz); the Chinese pipa, liuqin and ruan (the latter in its tenor and bass zhongruan and daruan/moon lute variants); the Japanese shamisen and the European lute.

=== Career ===
==== Early work ====
Even before graduation, Cawood was heavily involved in both London's live music scene and in touring music. By the age of seventeen, he'd become a professional musician. In 2006, at the age of eighteen, he toured as a backup guitarist for Icelandic alt-folk singer Hafdis Huld, during which time he also made his debut radio broadcast on Gideon Coe's BBC 6 Music show. Between the ages of nineteen and twenty-one, Cawood played guitar and bass guitar in Achilla, a Gothic progressive metal band (also featuring future Haken keyboard player Diego Tejeida) which got strong reviews from Metal Hammer for their eponymous debut EP (plus an 8/10 live review).

==== Main work as band member ====
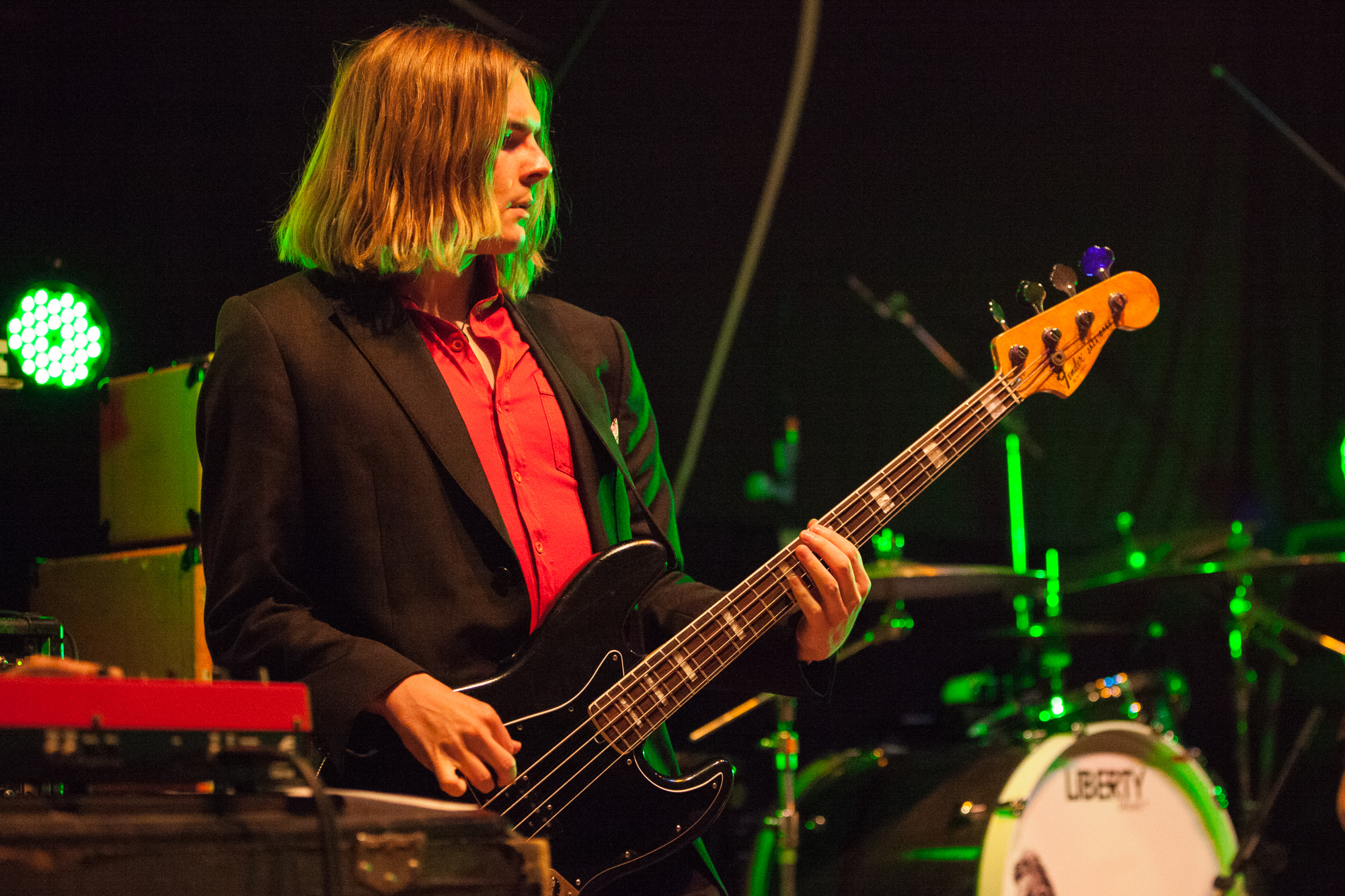
Cawood with Knifeworld at Tramlines 2015

Cawood is currently the principal backing instrumentalist and co-arranger for Mediaeval Baebes (for whom he plays up to eight different instruments on tour). As of 2020, he has performed a similar role for the Anchoress.

As an art-rock/progressive rock band member, Cawood is the bass guitarist for Kyros and Lost Crowns, and the guitarist for art-pop group Tonochrome. Cawood has also contributed guitar/bass guitar/bağlama to "noir art-deco pop" project Spiritwo, was the bass guitarist in Knifeworld, and has covered for guitarist Keith Moline in Kev Hopper's "micro-riffing" art-rock quartet Prescott. He has worked with goth/post-punk/industrial pop band Neurotic Mass Movement and previously played guitar for the Frank Zappa cover band Spiders of Destiny.

Outside of the rock world, Cawood plays bass guitar, electric guitar, sitar and tzouras for the "electronic gamelan" group My Tricksy Spirit. and both electric and acoustic bass (plus electric guitar, sitar and bağlama) for London nu-jazz band Join the Din. He sometimes plays chamber folk with fellow Mediaeval Baebe Sophie Ramsay and currently performs hammer dulcimer with occasional sea shanty band Admirals Hard (alongside Knifeworld/Lost Crowns bandmates Kavus Torabi and Richard Larcombe plus other London-based art rockers).

==== Classical and world music work ====
As a classical musician, Cawood is best known for having performed the pipa part for the UK premiere of Philip Glass' chamber opera Sound of a Voice but has also worked with the Chamber Music Company and the Temujin Ensemble.

Cawood is also a noted player on the London world music scene. He has performed Chinese music (mostly on daruan) with Yin Yang Collective, Central Asian music (on oud, bağlama and pipa) with Uzbek singer Alla Seydalieva, and Turkish/Romani music with Opaz Ensemble. He was also part of the Anatolian folk-fusion group which later launched the career of Olcay Bayir. As a gamelan musician, he's worked with LSO Community Gamelan Group and Lila Cita.

==== Work as project leader and composer ====
In addition to his work as a supporting player, Cawood composes his own instrumental music. He has stated that although his music refers to and is influenced by avant-garde music, he doesn't aim to be avant-garde himself, preferring to produce "accessible" music. His debut solo album, The Divine Abstract was released on the Bad Elephant Music label on 3 November 2017. Blending multiple aspects and influences from Cawood's career to date, the album featured twenty-one musicians drawn from his varied other bands and projects, including Mediaeval Baebes, Tonochrome, Knifeworld and assorted musicians associated with his SOAS alma mater. The Divine Abstract also featured forty-two different instruments drawn from European, Chinese, Indian and Middle Eastern traditions – various guitars and lutes; assorted keyboards, woodwinds, reeds, brass and strings; erhu, sitar, pipa, and a variety of percussion instruments from tuned Western orchestral to gamelan. The Divine Abstract received rave reviews, mostly from progressive rock magazines and websites.

Cawood's second solo album, Blurring into Motion, was released in 2019. Featuring a more Western-orientated instrumental palette, it featured two writing-and-performance collaborations with iamthemorning singer Marjana Semkina of as a guest vocalist on two tracks, and (bar returning cor anglais player Ben Marshall) a mostly new sixteen-strong cast of supporting musicians including percussionist Beibei Wang, London Myriad Ensemble flautist Julie Groves, VÄLVĒ harpist Elen Evans, cellist Maddie Cutter (Parallax Orchestra, Anna Meredith) and fellow composer-instrumentalists Maria Moraru (Pandora Jodara, Lullabies for the New Normal, Modulus Quartet, Mediaeval Baebes) and Thomas Stone. As was the case with its predecessor, the album was well received by reviewers.

==== Teaching and journalism ====
Cawood also works as an educator and writer. He teaches at the part-time guitar courses at the London Centre of Contemporary Music (part of the London College of Creative Media) and at All About the Band (a workshop for teenage musicians in the London borough of Southwark). He is a contributing writer for the folk and world music magazine Songlines. As an acknowledged sufferer from depression, he's written about the topic and its specific impact on musicians in an article written for Echoes and Dust.

== Personal life ==
In 2023 Cawood came out as a non-binary man and since adopted he/they pronouns.

== Discography ==
=== as project leader ===
- The Divine Abstract (Bad Elephant Music, BEM052, 2017)
- Blurring into Motion (Bad Elephant Music, 2019)

=== as group member ===
==== with Achilla ====
- Arashi EP (self-released, 2010) - listed as songwriter only

==== with Knifeworld ====
- Clairvoyant Fortnight EP (Believers Roast, BRR008, 2012)
- "Don't Land on Me" single (Believers Roast, 2014)
- The Unravelling (Inside Out Music, 2014)
- Home of the Newly Departed (Believers Roast, BR017/BR017LP, 2015)
- Bottled Out of Eden (Inside Out Music, IOMCD447/IOMLP 447, 2016)

==== with Tonochrome ====
- Tonochrome EP (Andres Razzini, AR001, 2012)
- Interference EP (Andres Razzini, AR002, 2013)
- "Not Gonna End Well" single (The Animal Farm, 2017)
- A Map in Fragments (Bad Elephant Music, 2018)

==== with Spiritwo ====
- Primitive Twinship (Renge Kyo Music, RKMCD002, 2013)
- "Mesumamim" single (Renge Kyo Music, RKMCD003, 2015)

==== with My Tricksy Spirit ====
- My Tricksy Spirit (Bad Elephant Music, BEM048, 2017)

==== with Lost Crowns ====
- Every Night Something Happens (Bad Elephant Music, 2019)

==== with Join the Din ====
- Elephants in Autumn Rage (Bad Elephant Music, 2022)
- ?Change! (Bad Elephant Music, 2023)

=== as contributing musician ===
==== with Sinah ====
- Sinah (Finaltune Records, FT 0601, 2015) - sitar and pipa on 'Loveless'
- Roads (ZNA Records, 2017) - bouzouki on 'Roads Two'

==== with Mediaeval Baebes ====
- Live at Berkeley Castle DVD (Mediaeval Baebes Ltd, QOS010DVD, 2015) - acoustic guitar, bağlama, daruan, oud, cuatro, bouzouki, percussion
- A Pocketful of Posies (Bellissima, BELLIS04, 2019) - bağlama, pipa, daruan, liuqin, dulcimer, zither, lyre, harp, hurdy gurdy, acoustic guitar, acoustic bass
- Prayers of the Rosary (Bellissima, BELLIS06, 2020) - zither, lyre, harp, hammered dulcimer, pipa, daruan, guzheng, oud, bağlama, bouzouki
- MydWynter (Bellissima, BELLIS08, 2022) - lyre, zither, harp, cuatro, guzheng, daruan, liuqin, hammered dulcimer

==== with I Heard from Lavinia ====
- "Different Kinds of Winter" single (Brilliant Corners, 195917006501, 2020) - bass guitar
- This Room Has No Doors (Brilliant Corners, 196700135330, 2022) - bass guitar

==== with The Anchoress ====
- "Small Black Flowers That Grow in the Sky" single (self-released, 2020) - acoustic & electric guitars, harp, bass guitar
- "Wicked Game single (self-released, 2020) - acoustic & electric guitars, harp, bass guitar
- "Enjoy the Silence" single (self-released, 2022) - acoustic guitar, bass guitar & glockenspiel
- "These Days" single (self-released, 2022) - acoustic guitar
- "The Tradition" single (self-released, 2022) - acoustic & electric guitars, bass guitar, glockenspiel, harp
- "Bizarre Love Triangle" single (self-released, 2022) - electric guitar & bass guitar
- "Friday I'm in Love (Acoustic)" single (self-released, 2022) - acoustic & electric guitars & bass guitar
- Versions EP2 (self-released, 2022) - electric guitar & bass guitar on 'Bizarre Love Triangle' & 'Friday I'm in Love'
- Versions EP3 (self-released, 2023) - guitar & bass guitar on 'This is Yesterday' & 'Martha's Harbour'; glockenspiel & harp on 'This is Yesterday'

==== other appearances ====
- Karin Fransson: Private Behaviour (Too Hip Records THR003CD, 2011) - sitar on 'Serious', electric guitar on 'Move On'
- Matt Stevens: Lucid (Esoteric Antenna, EANTCD 1027, 2014) - bass guitar on 'Oxymoron', 'Unsettled', and 'The Bridge'; pipa on 'The Other Side'
- Olcay Bayir: Neva/Harmony (Riverboat Records, TUGCD1088, 2014) - nylon-string classical guitar throughout
- Nick Prol & The Proletarians: Loon Attic (self-released, 2017) - guitar and bass guitar on 'Carvings on the Wall'
- Lucie Treacher: Wunderkabinett EP (self-released, 2017) - guitar and bass guitar on 'Cross Fire'
- Matt Calvert: Typewritten (Truant Recordings, TRNT001, 2018) - dulcimer on 'Mute Heart'
- Sterbus: Real Estate/Fake Inverno (Zillion Watt Records, STRB01, 2018) - sitar on 'Maybe Baby' and 'Micro New Wave'; electric & 12-string guitars on 'Maybe Baby'
- UPF: Planetary Overload - Part 1: Loss (Giant Electric Pea, 2019) - zhongruan, pipa, liuqin and electric guitar on 'Cruel Times'; oud, bağlama, bouzouki, dulcimer, zither and bass guitar on 'Forgive Me My Son'
- Marco Ragni: Oceans of Thought (Melodic Revolution Records, MRRCD22178, 2019) - sitar on 'Voice in the Dark'
- Evan Carson: Ocipinski (Evan Carson Music, ECMCD001, 2019) - zither, cuatro, bouzouki, oud, acoustic guitar, acoustic bass
- Nick Marsh: Waltzing Bones (Belissima, BELISS05, 2020) - liuqin, dulcimer, zither
- Chlöe Herington: Silent Reflux (Believers Roast, BR2 6CD, 2021) - bağlama, oud
- The Witching Tale: The Witching Tale (Bellissima – BELLIS 07, 2021) - credited performer, no specifics
- Greta Aurora: Dying Venus EP (Falling A, 2022) - acoustic bass, dulcimer, zither, electric guitar & bass guitar on 'The Hourglass', 'Venus Without Furs' and 'My Apocalypse
