= Time for Truth =

Studio album by Simon Collins
- Released: July 2005
- Recorded: 2004
- Genres: Electronic, pop
- Label: Lightyears Music
- Producers: Simon Collins and Gareth Jones

Simon Collins chronology
All of Who You Are (1999/2000)	Time for Truth (2005)	U-Catastrophe (2008)

Singles from Time for Truth
- 1. "Man on TV" Released: 2005; 2. "Hold On" Released: 2005

Time for Truth is the second album by Simon Collins.

== Track listing ==
1. "Time for Truth" (Simon Collins) – 6:39
2. "Use Your Imagination" (Collins, Markie J) – 3:47
3. "Reason" (Collins, Paul Schulte) – 4:38
4. "Hold On" (Collins) – 4:15
5. "Man on TV" (Collins) – 4:59
6. "Out on the Playa" (Collins, Johan Daansen) – 3:07
7. "Sunburn" (Collins, A.K.-S.W.I.F.T.) – 5:16
8. "Home" (Collins) – 4:47
9. "Mirror" (Mike Callewaert, Kemal Morris) – 4:31
10. "One Nation" (Collins, Ahmed Azzamouri, A.K.-S.W.I.F.T., Anthony Rother) – 5:23
11. "Super Cell" (Collins, Julian Styles) – 4:45
12. "Awesome Machinery" (Collins) – 4:18

Songs recorded, but did not make album final cut

1. "Heal in Time" – 4:04
2. "Belong (Here I Am)" – 5:18

== Personnel ==
- Simon Collins – vocals, keyboards (1–8, 10, 11, 12), guitars (1, 4, 5, 6, 8, 10), drums (1–6, 8, 10, 11, 12)
- Sean McKay – keyboards (6)
- Schallbau – keyboards (9), programming (9)
- Ahmed Azzamouri – keyboards (10)
- Marcus Deml – guitars (2, 3, 5, 7, 8, 12)
- Andy Blöcher – guitars (4)
- Mark Hensley – guitars (5, 11)
- Kelly Nordstrom – guitars (6)
- A.C. Boutsen – guitars (9)
- Oliver Poschmann – bass (6)
- Julian Styles – bass (11)
- Paul Schutle – drums (7)
- Elvira – backing vocals (1)
- Markie J – rap (2)
- Nena Gerhard – backing vocals (3)
- A.K.-S.W.I.F.T. – rap (7, 10)

== Production ==
- Simon Collins – producer, design
- Gareth Jones – additional producer
- Paul Schutle – co-producer, engineer
- Cet Merlin – co-producer (1, 2), mixing (1, 2)
- Sean McKay – co-producer (6)
- Schallbau – producers (9), mixing (9)
- Julian Styles – co-producer (11)
- Peter Steiber – additional vocal producer
- ST Schmidt – additional engineer
- Shael Wrinch – additional engineer
- Sarah Andresen – mixing (3, 4, 7, 8, 10, 12)
- Chris von Rautenkranz – mixing (3, 4, 7, 8, 10, 12)
- Mark Hensley – mixing (5, 6, 11), co-producer (6), mastering (9)
- Andrew Fedorow – production manager
- Art & Werbeteam – design
- Cocodesign.de, Tummytech.com and spm music.biz – additional graphics
- Gordon Dumka – cover photography
- Ralf Strathmann – cover photography

Studios

- Recorded at Fusion Music, Elektrovolt and Schallbau Studio (Frankfurt, Germany); Gismo 7 Studio (Motril, Spain); Beatty Lane Studio, Lightyears and Desolation Sound Studios (Vancouver, British Columbia, Canada).
- Mixed at Soundgarten Tonstudio (Oldenburg, Germany); Schallbau Studio; Lightyears.
