= Kyros (band) =

English rock and pop group

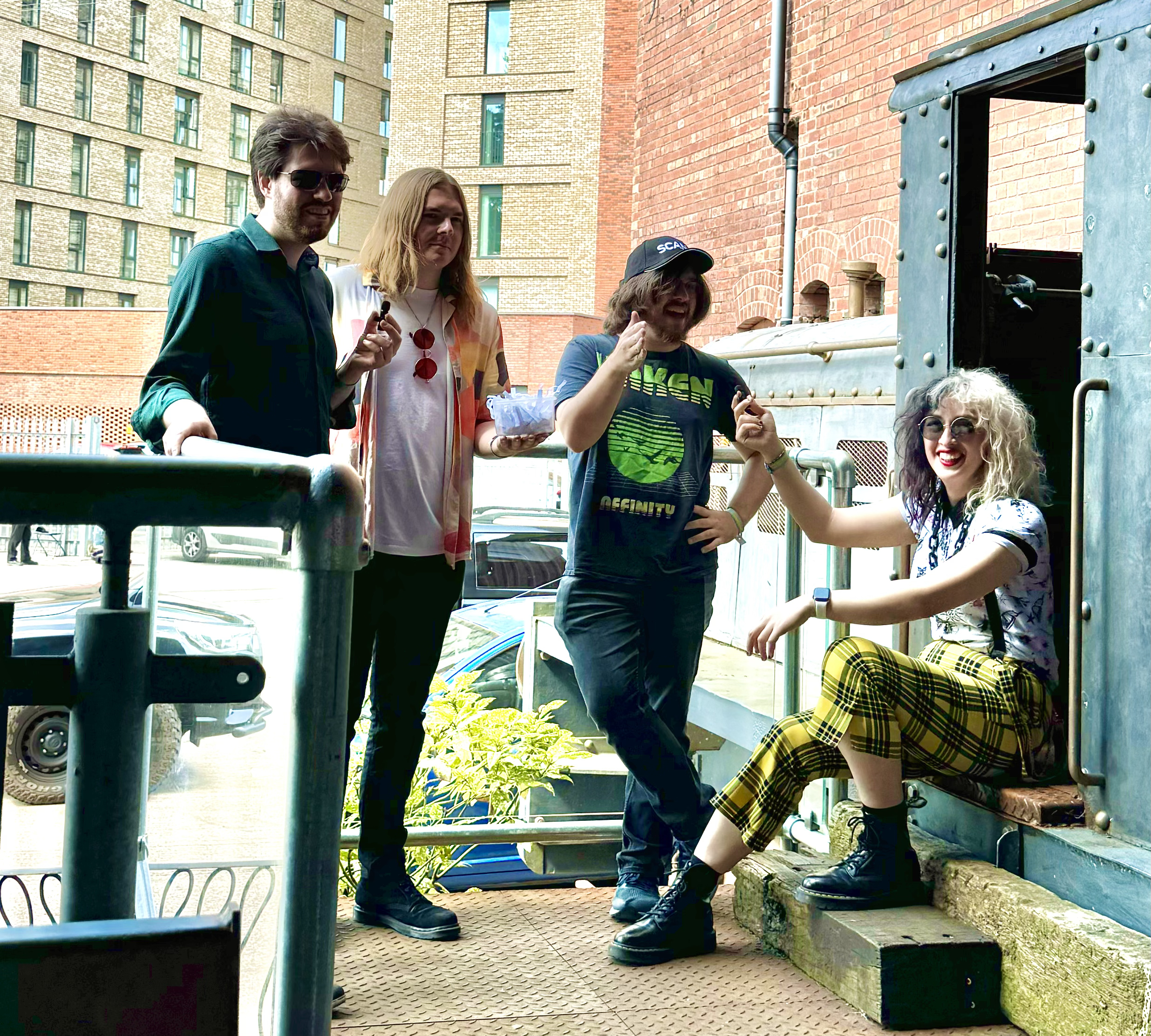
- Kyros backstage at Radar Festival in Greater Manchester in 2024

Background information
- Also known as: Synaesthesia (2012–2015)
- Origin: England
- Genres: Progressive rock; alternative rock; art pop; synth pop; neo-prog
- Years active: 2012–present
- Labels: White Star; Giant Electric Pea; Independent
- Members: Shelby Logan Warne; Robin Johnson; Joey Frevola
- Past members: Nikolas Jon Aarland; Ollie Hannifan; Sam Higgins; Peter Episcopo; Charlie Cawood
- Website: kyrosmusic.com

Kyros (typically stylised as KYROS, formerly known as Synaesthesia) is an English rock and pop group. Their music incorporates elements of progressive rock, art rock, and synth pop. Originally a solo project of multi-instrumentalist and singer Shelby Logan Warne in collaboration with guitarist Nikolas Jon Aarland, Kyros (known as Synaesthesia at the time) evolved into a full band in 2013, and their debut self-titled album was released in January 2014.

As of 2026, Kyros has released six studio albums and five EPs.

== Biography ==
=== 2009–2013: Formation and signing to Giant Electric Pea ===
Having gone through a number of incarnations, Kyros dates back to 2009 as Shelby Logan Warne's solo music project under the working title of Chromology. Warne had begun her experimentation with songwriting whilst undergoing studies at The BRIT School for Performing Arts and Technology.

In 2010, Warne began writing what would eventually become Kyros's debut album under the name of Synaesthesia. In 2012, she joined in collaboration with fellow Middlesex University student Nikolas Jon Aarland, who helped record guitar parts. Aarland was involved in the recording process of the early demos but left the project in 2013 soon after his parts were re-recorded at Aubitt Studios for the GEP release of the album. This was due to his ongoing work with a number of other projects. He was replaced by guitarist Ollie Hannifan, who helped record the remaining guitar parts for the album, along with contributions from IQ guitarist Michael Holmes.

Under the band name Synaesthesia, Warne signed a recording deal with Giant Electric Pea in February 2012 and promptly started the recording process at Aubitt Studios in Southampton for the band's debut album, with IQ guitarist and Giant Electric Pea CEO Michael Holmes as producer and Rob Aubrey as recording engineer. The album was recorded through the process of multi-track recording and overdubbing, as all instruments with the exception of bass guitar and electric guitar were performed by Warne. Guitars were recorded by Hannifan and Aarland, with minor edits and re-recordings by Holmes. Bass was recorded by Holmes, with the exception of Aarland on the track "Technology Killed The Kids."

Once the recording of the album had been finished, Warne began the process of completing the band lineup for future albums and live shows. She welcomed into the band the second guitarist Samuel Higgins, whom she had also met through university; drummer Robin Johnson, whom she met on an online forum; and bassist Peter Episcopo, whom she met via recording engineer Rob Aubrey. Warne has performed all vocals, synths, and keyboard from then on.

Kyros's debut album, Synaesthesia, was released on 20 January 2014.

The band performed their debut concert at The Cultuurpodium Boerderij in Zoetermeer supporting IQ and received positive reviews of their performance.

=== 2014: Departure of Ollie Hannifan and Joey Frevola's joining ===
In early April 2014, the band announced that guitarist Ollie Hannifan would be taking what was then a temporary leave due to his commitments to stage production Mamma Mia!. A post on the band's Facebook page stated the following: "In terms of what's happening when Ollie returns is not yet clear. At the moment, we're going to see what happens when he finishes the tour and we'll take it from there." Following this, the band sent out a press release announcing the search for a fill-in guitarist. The press release stated that the position was required to be filled until January 2015. Although the position was clearly announced as temporary, applicants were told via email response that there would be no restrictions to their membership of the band, and they could contribute to the band creatively and artistically. This meant that they would be listed not as a Touring member but as a full-time member for the period that they were filling in for Hannifan.

On 28 May 2014, the band announced on their Facebook page, "After nearly five weeks of discussions and reviewing over the auditions and applications we received to replace Ollie Hannifan for the next eight months, we are very happy to announce who we chose." The band welcomed guitarist Joey Frevola into the band to temporarily replace Hannifan for the period stated. Frevola became a full-time member of Kyros with the ability to contribute to writing sessions for future songs in addition replacing Hannifan for live concerts.

In January 2015, the band announced that Frevola would become a permanent member since Hannifan would no longer be available to return to the band. This announcement was made at their headline show at W2, Den Bosch, in the Netherlands.

=== 2015–2016: Name change, split from GEP and release of EP ===
In spring 2015, the band opened for Marillion at the Wolverhampton Marillion Weekend event before making their North American debut at RoSfest

On 24 September 2015, the band announced via Facebook, newsletter, and their website that they would be changing their name from Synaesthesia to Kyros, effective from the end of the European Spock's Beard tour of 2015, on which they were a supporting act. This marked a new period, as the debut album was originally a solo project of Warne but had since gone on to become a fully-fledged band with a creative style heading in a vastly different direction from their debut album.

Within the same announcement, the band stated that they would no longer be working with Giant Electric Pea due to "creative differences." This led to the band announcing that not only would they be releasing their second album independently, but they would also be producing, mixing, mastering, pressing, and promoting the album independently, taking influence from bands such as Marillion who are known to work independently from major record labels and finance their albums using crowdfunding.

To help fund their new album, as part of the same announcement, the band cited that they would be independently releasing a limited edition pressing of an EP titled BETA. It was the first independent release from the band, with all work including mixing and album art undertaken by members of the band. The BETA EP contained three work-in-progress tracks from the band's then-upcoming album and three demos from the recording and writing sessions of their debut album.

Following the release of the band's BETA EP, their social media posting and presence dramatically dropped whilst they continued to work on what would eventually become their second studio album, the double album Vox Humana.

=== 2017–2018: Vox Humana, KMG and independence ===
Towards the end of 2016, the band dispatched a press release announcing a double album, titled Vox Humana, which was to be independently released through their newly established management company and record label KYROS Media Group, or KMG. The announcement detailed that the release had been a culmination of approximately three years of writing, recording and mixing with efforts from all members: Shelby Logan Warne on vocals, keyboards and mixing; Joey Frevola on guitars and programming; Sam Higgins on vocals, guitars and additional programming; Peter Episcopo on vocals and bass guitar; and Robin Johnson on drums and percussion. The band made it clear that Vox Humana was Kyros's first professional release as a band since transitioning from a solo studio project whilst signed to GEP Records. The album also features a full live brass section with parts arranged by Raymond Hearne, better known as the drummer of progressive metal band Haken. The double album was mastered by Jens Bogren at Fascination Street Studios in Sweden.

Within the same period, the band released the maxi single "Cloudburst," which consisted of multiple versions of the track "Cloudburst," including a shortened radio edit to appeal to a mainstream radio audience, and an extended "feature-length mix" marketed towards the progressive scene. Following the release of the single on 21 September 2016 and Vox Humana on 5 November 2016, the band released another EP on 12 February 2017 titled Monster EP. Similar to the "Cloudburst" maxi single, this EP included a radio edit of their track "Monster" as well as alternate versions of the track. However, the Monster EP also included two entirely new tracks: "Indigo Was Her", which preceded the eventual album version of "Monster" before being shelved and later adjusted, and "The Door", which was written by Joey Frevola as part of his contribution towards an external songwriting project. "The Door"'s mix and overall sound palette was adjusted once taken in by the band as a Kyros song.

With an emphasis on image and a conscious approach towards artwork, the band worked closely with artist Matt Verges the creation of the artwork for Vox Humana and the Monster EP. Verges had been working in close partnership with the band since these two releases and continues to work with them for further plans. Continuing the band's conscious approach to artwork and image, they released a simple self-produced music video for the track "Cloudburst," which made use of projectors and overlays, and a CGI video for the track "Monster", which was directed by Miles Skarin and produced by Crystal Spotlight. The video includes the use of 3D depth scanning and advanced 3D modelling. Since then, the band have also continued to work closely with Crystal Spotlight.

=== 2019: Departure of Samuel Higgins ===
On 7 April 2019, the band announced the departure of Samuel Higgins via their Facebook page. Higgins' last performance with the band was at the annual 2DaysProg+1 Festival in Veruno, Italy, in September 2018. Within the same post, the band announced that they would continue as a four-piece lineup with Joey Frevola taking on backing vocals. Responding to fan queries via comments, the band had also stated that all of Higgins's parts had been recorded for their upcoming third studio album, Celexa Dreams.

=== 2020–Present: Signing to White Star Records and release of Celexa Dreams and Mannequin ===
On 13 March 2020, the band announced their signing to White Star Records, a label run by musician and record producer John Mitchell and Magick Eye Records head Chris Hillman.

On signing to White Star Records, Warne commented:

“When we were introduced to White Star, we knew from the get-go that it would be a natural fit. John and Chris’s open-mindedness meant that they understood our desires to experiment and try out different styles, and that we would have a very clear-cut vision on how we wanted to go about executing our ideas. The limits are ours to push. For all of us in Kyros, that’s incredibly important and motivating. This is a new chapter for Kyros, and one that will undoubtedly surprise a lot of people. I’m incredibly excited for what the future holds.”

Mirroring Warne's enthusiasm, Hillman exclaimed:

"We’ve been thoroughly pleased with the positive feedback we’ve had for the previous releases on our White Star Records label, but that also creates a pressure to ensure that future releases maintain a high standard. That pressure is made a lot easier with bands like Kyros! When we heard early mixes of the band’s new album, we knew that the band would be a worthy addition to our White Star family of artists. Inventive and exciting and with great melodies too, the band have progressed impressively from their previous, well-received releases. We are looking forward to getting the finished tracks out there and looking forward to working with this fine band of exceptional musicians.”

Soon after, both the label and the band announced that their upcoming studio album, entitled Celexa Dreams, would be released on the 19 June 2020 and "would consist of a collection of short stories, each underpinned with a thought-provoking lyrical concept. From delving into the emotional weight of working in a job you hate to the more serious commentary on the dangers of toxic internet culture and anonymity, each slice of the band’s forthcoming album pulls from threads of the band’s collectively accumulated life experiences." The album's lead single Rumour was released on 17 April 2020 and displayed a change in direction and sound palette for the band. Journalist Eden Kupermintz described the style of Rumour and the rest of Celexa Dreams as "a giant love letter to that sweet (and sometimes painful) time when progressive rock bands like Yes, Rush, and others were experimenting with the synth-pop sounds of the 80’s and early 90’s. The result is an eclectic and well written album filled with tasty bass, prominent synths, and ethereal, evocative vocals."

On 7 May 2020, the band released their second single from Celexa Dreams, entitled Phosphene, which was described by Metal Mayhem Radio as "a dense, textural track that adopts a more deliberate pace into deep, ballad-esque territories." A press release was announced with Warne stating, “‘Phosphene' is a very personal song to me. It was actually written directly in response to our debut album, Synaesthesia. I wrote the lyrics on that album about someone who had negatively affected my life in a significant way at that point. I fell out of contact with that individual, but many years later, re-established contact after realising how pointless it was to hold onto grudges. It’s all just teenage drama at the end of the day. We mature, we gain experiences and learn how to cope with certain situations as we grow older.”

Phosphene marked another push towards new territory as the band explored a slower-paced, ballad-esque approach to songwriting with inspiration taken from eighties ballads, modern synth pop and vaporwave.

As a result of the 2020 COVID-19 pandemic, the band had to cancel multiple shows and appearances as well as music video and press photo shoots leading up to the release of Celexa Dreams, but they went onto to create their Celexa Streams: Isolation Gigs 'online tour' series on Facebook and YouTube, with seven live-streamed shows broadcast between April and September 2020. These performances included most of the band's discography, as well as a special edition covers show in which they performed their own renditions of HAKEN's The Good Doctor (with guests Ray Hearne on drums and Ihlo's Andy Robison guesting on vocals), Frost*'s Heartstrings (with guest John Mitchell on vocals), RUSH's Force Ten, Genesis' Behind The Lines, and Imogen Heap's Closing In.

On 23 November 2020, Kyros announced that they would be releasing a surprise EP entitled "Four of Fear," which would include four new tracks written, recorded, mixed and mastered entirely during the months of September and October 2020. The band also released the video for the track Fear of Fear that same day, along with the EP's cover art.

Regarding the EP, the band wrote: "'Four of Fear' contains four very purposefully different sounding tracks that represent four very different sides of the bands writing style. From the wacky and eccentric through to the lush and dense through to the anthemic, hooky side of our writing. We wanted to see if this experiment of four different musical styles, yet with multiple common threads running between them would ‘work’ and we’re incredibly proud of the results. Lyrically, this track is about coming to terms with the fear of people's prejudice and close-mindedness and the mind tricks and mental preparation that goes into being honest to not just other people, but even yourself. Being truly afraid of being open because you fear other people fearing your true self.”

The band stated that during the COVID-19 lockdown period, they had managed to streamline an online workflow enabling them to fulfill the tight turnaround of recording, mixing and assembling their Celexa Streams: Isolation Gigs videos, and that they wanted to utilise this workflow to experiment with creating a new release.

Warne came out as transgender in 2021.

In 2023, Charlie Cawood was announced as the new bassist for the quartet, replacing Episcopo.

Mannequin was released on 2 February 2024.

On 22 November 2024, the band released a single titled Fear & Love.

== Musical style ==
Kyros perform a brand of alternative rock, electronic rock and art rock with heavy leanings towards progressive rock. In addition, the band takes influence from eighties, nineties and modern pop music.

Kyros have cited Porcupine Tree, Kate Bush, Muse, Radiohead, Rush, CHVRCHES, The Dear Hunter, Duran Duran, Frost*, Trevor Horn, IQ, Spock's Beard and more as major influences.

== Personnel ==
=== Current members ===
- Shelby Logan Warne – vocals, keyboards, synthesizer, mixing engineer (2011–present)
- Joey Frevola – guitars and backing vocals (2014–present)
- Robin Johnson – drums and percussion (2013–present)

=== Former members ===
- Nikolas Jon Aarland – guitars (2012–2013)
- Ollie Hannifan – guitars (2013–2014)
- Samuel Higgins – guitars and backing vocals (2013–2018)
- Peter Episcopo – bass guitar and backing vocals (2013–2023)
- Charlie Cawood – bass guitar (2023–2026)

=== Collaborators ===
- Michael Holmes – producer, guitars (2013–2014)
- Ray Hearne – brass arrangement (on Vox Humana, 2016)

== Discography ==
Demos

- Chromology, 'Time, Tension & Intervention' (2011)

Studio albums

- Synaesthesia (2014)
- Vox Humana (2016)
- Celexa Dreams (2020)
- Celexa Streams (2021)
- RECOVER (2021)
- Mannequin (2024)

EPs and singles

- BETA EP (2015)
- "Cloudburst" maxi single (2016)
- Monster EP (2017)
- Four of Fear (2020)
- Fear & Love (2024)
