= Ihlo =

British progressive metal band

IHLO
- Origin: United Kingdom
- Genres: Progressive metal; djent; Progressive rock
- Years active: 2016–present
- Label: Kscope
- Members: Andy Robison; Phil Monro; Clark McMenemy; Rob Mair; Max Brayson
- Past members: Michael Roberts
- Website: ihlo.co.uk

Ihlo (/ˈaɪ.loʊ/ EYE-loh; often stylised as IHLO) are a British progressive metal band. The group was formed in 2016 by vocalist/keyboardist Andy Robison, guitarist Phil Monro, and joined soon after by drummer Clark McMenemy. The band have released two studio albums, which combine the use of djent-based riffs with the use of atmospheric synthesizer sounds. They have been part of the Kscope label since 2024.

== History ==
=== Formation and Union (2016–2023) ===
The band formed in 2016 as a studio-based project, when Phil Monro met Aberdeen-based musician Andy Robison through Facebook internet meme groups. The duo collaborated remotely on electronic music and progressive rock demos before introducing Robison's acquaintance, Clark McMenemy, as the group's drummer in 2017.

While working on their first album, Ihlo released their first singles, "Reanimate" and "Parhelion". Ihlo's first studio album, titled "Union", was released independently on 31 May 2019. The album was composed and recorded by Robison and Monro, with McMenemy providing the drum programming.

On 27 June 2019, Ihlo recruited Michael Roberts (bass) and Rob Mair (guitar) to perform in their first live show, supporting Jolly and Kyros. On 24 October 2020, during the COVID-19 pandemic, Ihlo participated in the Progspace Online Festival through a pre-recorded live performance to a positive audience reaction. During the show, they debuted "In Stasis", an unreleased track from their previous studio work, and introduced "Replica" from their upcoming album.

On 20 August 2021, Ihlo's Robison participated as a guest vocalist on Kyros' rendition of Haken's The Good Doctor.

On 9 September 2022, the group debuted "Haar", a track from their upcoming album, as part of their second live EP, recorded in Birmingham.

On 20 April 2023, Ihlo supported Voyager on the latter's pre-Eurovision London show. On 8 October 2023, the group participated in ProgPower Europe 2023, later releasing their performance as a live EP.

=== Signing to Kscope and Legacy (2024–present) ===
On 4 July 2024, Ihlo announced their signing to Kscope, an independent progressive rock label under Snapper Music. On 11 October 2024, Kscope reissued Ihlo's Union album, remastered by Tesseract's Acle Kahney.

In early 2025, Ihlo announced the departure of their bassist Michael Roberts, whose spot was later covered by Max Brayson.

On 29 August 2025, six years after the publication of Union, Ihlo released their second full-length album, "Legacy", through Kscope. The album featured contributions from Connor Mackie (guitars), Liam McLaughlin (acoustic guitars), and Romain Jeuniaux (guitars, backing vocals). While the album maintained the band's atmospheric progressive metal style, reviewers particularly praised its production and emotional passages. The band noted that Legacy followed a different mindset compared to their first album, with them willing to spend more time to style and record their compositions to speak "in [Ihlo's] own voice". Legacy took the sixth place in the Prog Magazine's 2025 list of best albums of the year.

On 27 September 2025, Ihlo played in Germany's Euroblast Festival 2025, replacing Haken, who had earlier announced their cancellation. Soon after, Ihlo were announced as supports for Leprous on their 2026 winter tour and for Between the Buried and Me on the England leg of their 2026 tour.

== Musical style and influences ==
Ihlo have cited Leprous, Porcupine Tree, Devin Townsend, TesseracT, Boards of Canada, 2814 and video game soundtracks as influences, with reviewers noticing similarities to Haken, The Contortionist, Riverside, Voyager and Muse.

Ihlo describe their style as a "fusion of progressive metal, electronic elements & subtle pop hooks". Reviewers have noted the regular use of "unpredictable rhythm shifts, complex time signatures, a strong use of electronics and keys, and progressive djenty riffs". Their tracks often combine heavy melodic music with atmospheric and ambient soundscapes. In interviews, the band have declared that their remote approach to collaborative composition, as opposed to jam sessions, has been a main factor behind their complex sound. Their albums feature long-form songs, with Union's "Coalescence" exceeding 15 minutes in length.

Robison's vocal style features clean singing in the tenor range, sometimes layered with Romain Jeuniaux's screaming vocals. Lyrically, Union explored themes of relationship and interconnectedness, while Legacy focused in technology and corporate greed, where "technological progress has lost its initial, blinding sheen and become a burden on mankind instead".

== Band members ==
=== Current ===
- Andy Robison – lead vocals, keyboards (2016–present)
- Phil Monro – guitars, backing vocals (2016–present)
- Clark McMenemy – drums (2017–present)
- Rob Mair – guitars (2019–present)
- Max Brayson – bass (2025–present)

=== Former ===
- Michael Roberts – bass (2019–2025)

== Discography ==
Studio albums

- Union (2019)
- Legacy (2025)

Live albums

- In Stasis (Live EP) (2020)
- Live Sessions From Pirate Studios (2022)
- Live At ProgPower Europe (2024)

Singles

- Reanimate (2019)
- Parhelion (2019)
- Haar (Live Sessions From Pirate Studios) (2022)
- Empire (2025)
- Replica (2025)
- Mute (2025)
