= Dave Kerzner =

American musician, producer, sound designer (born 1968)

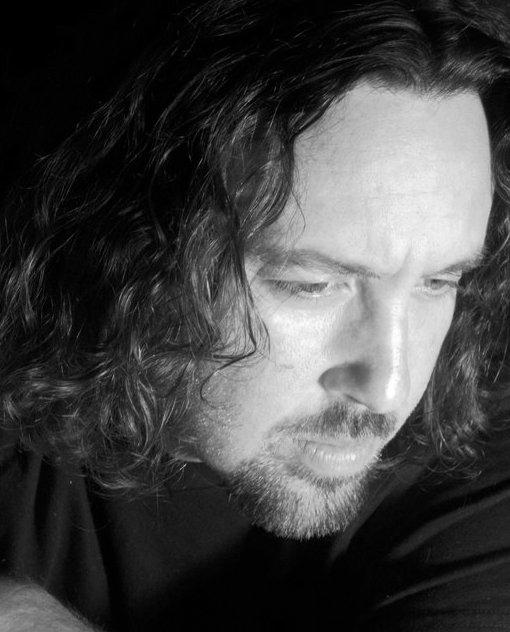

Background information
- Born: David Nathaniel Kerzner; July 10, 1968 (age 58)
- Genres: Progressive rock; alternative rock; ambient; film score
- Occupations: Musician; songwriter; producer; sound designer
- Instruments: Keyboard; piano; guitar; drums; vocals
- Years active: 1989–present
- Member of: Sound of Contact; Mantra Vega; In Continuum; Arc of Life
- Website: davekerzner.com

David Nathaniel Kerzner (born July 10, 1968) is an American musician, songwriter, producer, and sound designer as well as the founder of the sound sampling development company Sonic Reality Inc. Along with Simon Collins, Kerzner is the co-founder of the band Sound of Contact. He is also the co-founder of the band Mantra Vega and his debut solo album, New World, was released in December 2014.

During his music career, Kerzner has worked with artists and bands including Alan Parsons, Genesis, Francis Dunnery, Neil Peart, Keith Emerson, Tom Waits, and the Smashing Pumpkins.

== Early years ==
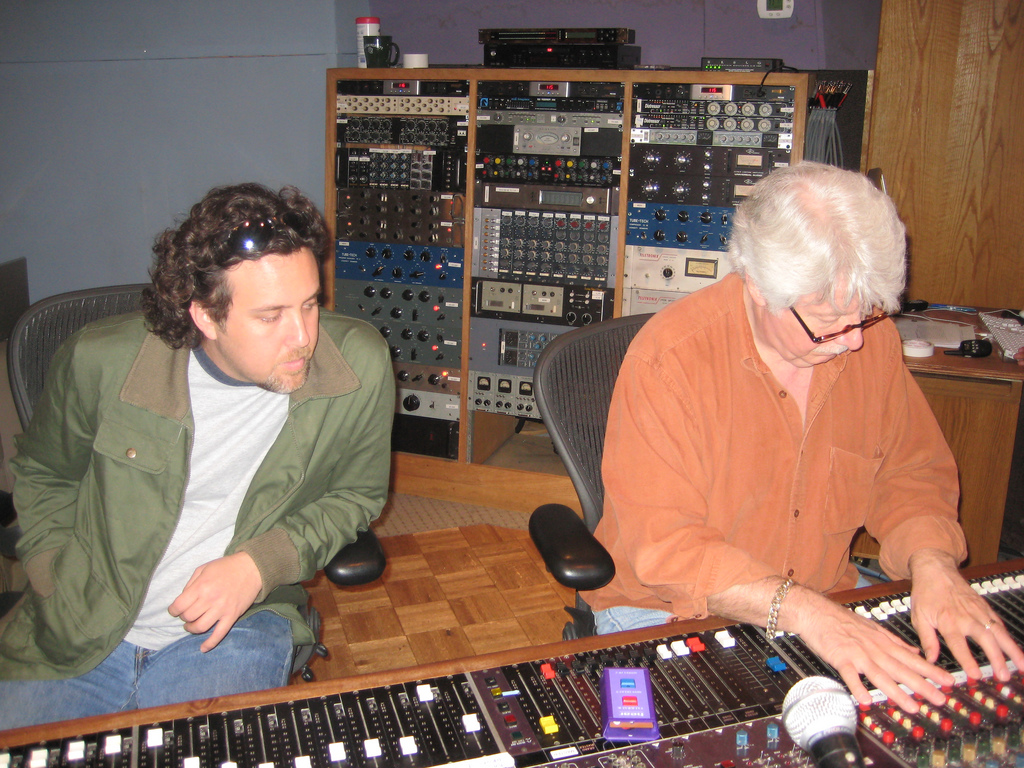
Kerzner and Ken Scott, left to right

Dave Kerzner's interest in progressive music was piqued by early Genesis music. He was introduced to them by his good friend and band collaborator Jamie Rickel (drums). The early years were spent tirelessly working on and developing original recordings, along with Dave Silverman (bass and vocals).

In the early 1990s, Kerzner began collecting rare musical instruments. When 16-bit stereo digital sampling technology became available, Kerzner sampled the instruments to license to major digital musical instrument manufacturers including Alesis, Roland and Yamaha. After an endeavor in the music software industry, Kerzner worked with Madonna, Ringo Starr, and the Moog Cookbook as both a musician and as a sound engineer.

In 1994, Kerzner contributed to Kevin Gilbert's solo album Thud and appeared as a band member on Gilbert's live album Live at the Troubadour. Kerzner joined the band Giraffe as keyboardist for a one-off tribute performance of Genesis' The Lamb Lies Down on Broadway album at Progfest '94 in Los Angeles.

== Collaborations ==
In 2005 Kerzner performed with Jon Anderson of Yes along with Nick D'Virgilio, Stan Cotey, and Mark Hornsby under the band name Sonik Elementz for a one-off performance of "Long Distance Runaround" during the Winter NAMM Show in Anaheim, California. Between 2007 and 2010, Kerzner collaborated musically with Simon Collins, a drummer and the son of Phil Collins. In 2010 Kerzner contributed sound design and assisted with music software for Steven Wilson's album Grace For Drowning.

== Sonic Reality and Sonic Elements ==
Kerzner sitting at an Emblem Steinway piano

In 1996 Kerzner founded the sound development company Sonic Reality Inc, which focuses on the sampling of every type of musical instrument from vintage keyboards to drums to orchestral and world instruments. While developing music technology and creative tools for musicians, Kerzner collaborated with professional artists to sample and digitally reproduce the sounds of many types of musical instruments. The sounds are played from music software like samplers and other music recording tools. Sonic Reality produces "play along" DrummerTracks and other backing tracks for guitarists, bass players, keyboardists, and singers to work with via various audio devices, mobile devices, and recording software. His sounds have been used by artists worldwide.

In 2001 Kerzner teamed with IK Multimedia to offer the sounds he created for keyboard workstations via computer software. Producing a majority of the sound range for the first comprehensive software rompler virtual instrument called "SampleTank", he developed a plug-in for popular recording software which offers every type of sampled music instrument with built-in effects to be played via MIDI. While being the CEO of Sonic Reality Inc, Kerzner is a musician as well as providing custom sound programming for the Rolling Stones, Beyoncé, and other artists.

In 2011, Kerzner founded Sonic Elements, a progressive rock project and electronic tribute band. Sonic Elements uses Sonic Reality samples to create unique virtual supergroups by combining different musicians with Sonic Reality-sampled drummers and other instrumentation.

In November 2014, Sonic Elements announced the development of a tribute album remake of Genesis' 1974 record, The Lamb Lies Down On Broadway, to commemorate the 40th anniversary of its release. The tribute album has been titled IT and was to be released in early 2015. The album features several of Kerzner's collaborators including Francis Dunnery, Nick D'Virgilio, Steve Rothery, and Billy Sherwood. It combines vintage classic rock elements with an orchestra producing a cinematic rock sound. The album was eventually released in April 2025, for the 50th Anniversary of the original album. Original equipment acquired from Tony Banks has been used on the album.

== Sound of Contact ==
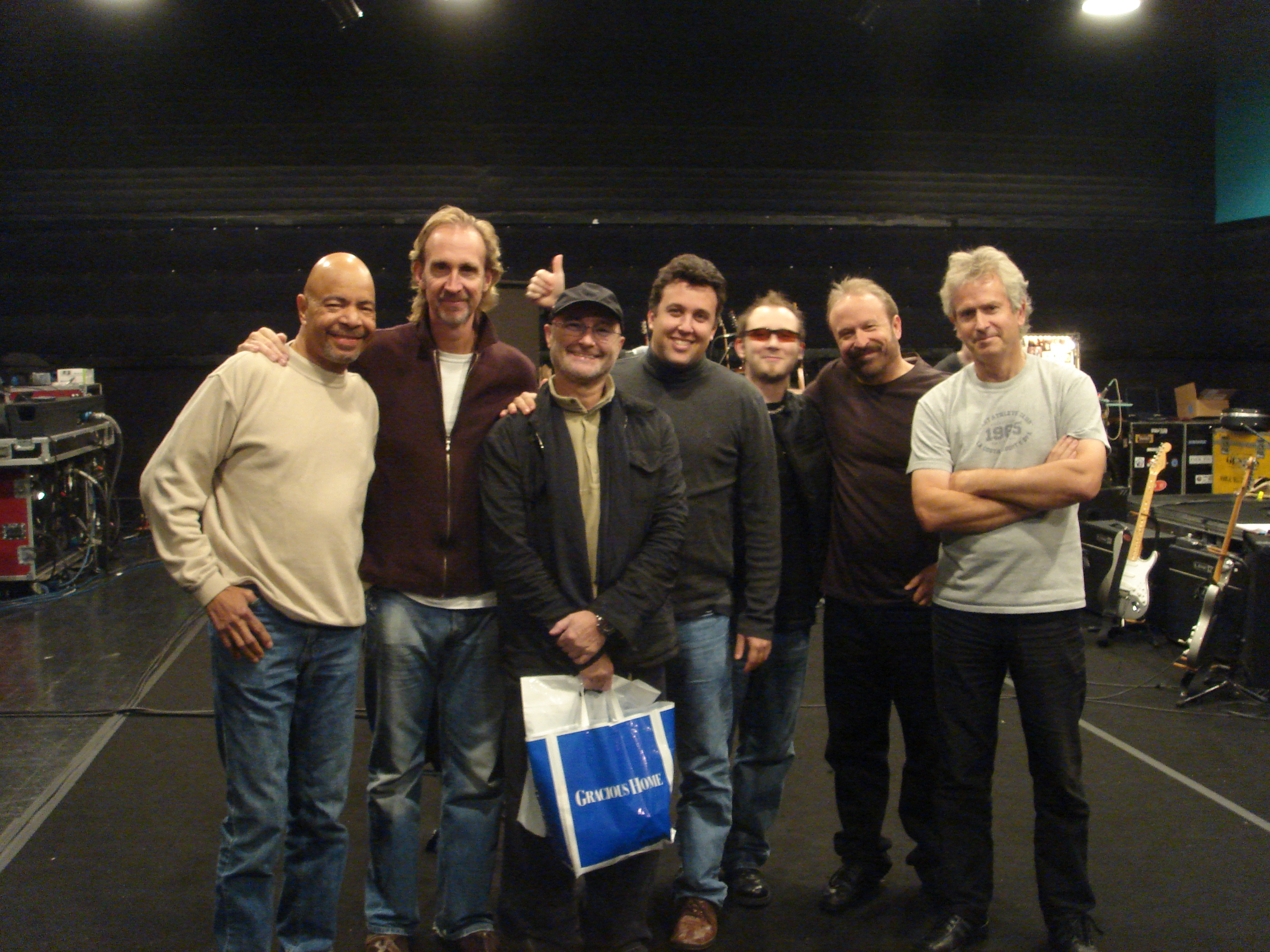
Kerzner with Genesis and drummer Simon Collins, the son of Phil Collins

After Kerzner's initial 2006 meeting with Simon Collins in New York City, they co-produced a remake of the Genesis song "Keep It Dark". Kerzner collaborated with Collins and played keyboards on his album U-Catastrophe, appearing on the song "The Big Bang".

In 2010, Kerzner and Collins decided to form a band. In 2012, they announced the band as Sound of Contact, with Collins on lead vocals and drums, Kerzner on keyboard as well as colleagues Matt Dorsey and Kelly Nordstrom on bass and guitar. The band's debut album, Dimensionaut, was released worldwide in late May 2013. On January 6, 2014, Kerzner left the band. The official press release from Sound of Contact cited the loss of Kerzner as being an "amicable split". Kerzner said that he planned to pursue his own solo projects and continue his work with his company, Sonic Reality. In May 2014, he announced that he and Mostly Autumn's Heather Findlay had co-founded a new band together, Mantra Vega.

Kerzner rejoined Sound of Contact in April 2015, and alongside Nordstrom, Collins, and Dorsey began work in Oxfordshire, England on the band's second album.

== Solo career ==
In December 2014, Kerzner released his first solo album, New World. The album features numerous artists including Fernando Perdomo, Nick D'Virgilio, Francis Dunnery, and Durga McBroom. Produced and mixed by Kerzner, New World was funded in part via a Kickstarter campaign.

The album's vocals and keyboards were provided by Kerzner. Using technology from Sonic Reality, mock-up tracks were created with Kerzner playing all of the instrumentation. After tracks were re-recorded live by other musicians he mixed the tracks. Renowned recording engineer Tom Lord-Alge mixed the album's first single release, "Stranded".

== Discography ==
=== Studio albums ===
- 2014: New World
- 2017: Static
- 2022: The Traveler
- 2023: Heart Land Mines Vol. 1

=== Remix albums ===
- 2016: New World - Instrumental

=== Live albums ===
- 2016: New World Live
- 2019 Static Live
- 2021 All Worlds Live In Miami
- 2023 Heart Land Mines Vol 1

=== EP albums ===
- 2016: Paranoia
- 2023: Heart Land Mines (The Eye)

=== Compilations ===
- 2019: Breakdown: A Compilation 1995-2019
- 2022 Corners Of The Mind (Highlights and rarities)

=== With Sonic Elements ===
- 2012: XYZ—A Tribute to Rush
- 2018: Yesterday and Today: A 50th Anniversary Tribute to Yes

=== With Sound of Contact ===
- 2013: Dimensionaut

=== With In Continuum ===
- 2019: Acceleration Theory Part One: AlienA
- 2019: Crash Landing (EP)
- 2019: Acceleration Theory Part Two: Annihilation

=== With Arc of Life ===
- 2021: Arc of Life
- 2022: Don't Look Down

=== With other artists ===
- 1995: Kevin Gilbert, Thud
- 1999: Kevin Gilbert "Live At the Troubadour 1995'
- 2008: Simon Collins, U-Catastrophe
- 2011: Steven Wilson, Grace For Drowning
- 2012: Steve Hackett, Genesis Revisited II
- 2019 Fernando Perdomo - "Zebra Crossing"
- 2019 Fernando Perdomo - "Fernando Perdomo Has Lost His Voice"
- 2019 The New Empire - "2nd Lifetime"
- 2020: The McBroom Sisters, Black Floyd
