= Rich Wilson (journalist) =

UK-based freelance rock music writer

Rich Wilson is a UK-based freelance rock music writer who has written for publications including Classic Rock Magazine, Metal Hammer, Record Collector, Rock Hard, the Virgin Encyclopedia of Popular Music, and Prog magazine.

He is also the author of the authorized biography of the band Dream Theater, titled Lifting Shadows, released in November 2013.
