= Sonic Reality =

- Type: Private company
- Industry: Computer software
- Founded: Los Angeles (1996)
- Founder: Dave Kerzner
- Headquarters: Miami
- Area served: Worldwide
- Key people: Dave Kerzner (President & CEO); Erik Norlander (Managing Director)
- Website: SonicReality.com

Sonic Reality Incorporated is an American sound development and music software company founded in 1996 by keyboardist and music producer Dave Kerzner. The company is headquartered in Miami, Florida.

== History ==
In the early 1990s, Dave Kerzner began collecting rare musical instruments and vintage keyboards from the 1960s and 1970s. When 16-bit stereo digital sampling became available, Kerzner began to create samples of those instruments in order to license to musical instrument companies. Companies such as Alesis, Yamaha and Roland used the sampling in their sound libraries, expansion boards, electronic keyboards and drum modules. The result was the first vintage instrument sample library, created by Kerzner in 1991 and known as "Vintage Keyboards and Classic Synths".

In 1996, Kerzner founded Sonic Reality. Through his company, Kerzner made available many of his preferred sounds to the music industry in the form of CD ROMs in order for musicians to access the sampled sounds from his collection of instruments. In 1999, Sonic Reality worked with Ilio Entertainment to distribute these sample collections to a number of keyboard manufacturers including Akai, Roland, Kurzweil, Digidesign, E-mu.

While developing music technology and creative tools for musicians, Kerzner collaborated with professional artists to sample and digitally reproduce the sounds of many types of musical instruments. The sounds are played from music software such as samplers and other music recording tools. The company later developed the Infinite Player for Native Instruments' Kontakt Player engine, a series of keyboard libraries and plugin systems to play Kerzner's custom sounds created with musicians such as Neil Peart and producers such as Hugh Padgham and Alan Parsons.

In 2001 Kerzner and Sonic Reality collaborated with IK Multimedia to offer the sounds he created for keyboard workstations via computer software. Producing a majority of the sound range for the first comprehensive software rompler virtual instrument called "SampleTank", Kerzner developed a plug-in for popular recording software that offers every type of sampled music instrument with built-in effects to be played via MIDI. With IK Multimedia, Sonic Reality co-created virtual instruments such as Sonik Synth, Miroslav Philharmonik, SampleTron and SampleMoog.

== Sonic Elements ==
In 2011, Kerzner founded Sonic Elements, a progressive rock project and electronic tribute band utilizing the technology he developed with his company. Sonic Elements uses Sonic Reality samples to create a virtual supergroup by combining well-known musicians with Sonic Reality-sampled drummers and other instrumentation.

In November 2014, Sonic Elements announced the development of a tribute album remake of Genesis' 1974 record, The Lamb Lies Down On Broadway, to commemorate the 40th anniversary of its release. The tribute album has been titled IT, and is scheduled for release in early 2015. The album is slated to feature several of Kerzner's musical collaborators including Francis Dunnery, Nick D'Virgilio, Steve Rothery and Billy Sherwood. The album also aims to combine vintage classic rock elements with an orchestra to produce a cinematic rock sound.
