= Free (OSI album) =

Studio album by OSI
- Released: April 21, 2006
- Recorded: November 2005
- Genre: Progressive rock
- Length: 46:40 (standard edition); 67:42 (special edition)
- Label: InsideOut
- Producers: Jim Matheos and Kevin Moore

OSI chronology
Office of Strategic Influence (2003)	Free (2006)	Blood (2009)

Free is the second studio album by American progressive rock band OSI, released by InsideOut Music on April 21, 2006.

Guitarist Jim Matheos and keyboardist and vocalist Kevin Moore decided to work on a follow-up to Office of Strategic Influence after the two found they both had holes in their schedules. Drummer Mike Portnoy returned as a session musician rather than a full band member. Joey Vera replaced Sean Malone on bass guitar.

Free was met with generally positive critical reception. Critics noted that the album was different from its predecessor, focusing more on Moore's keyboards than Matheos' guitars. Portnoy's drumming received praise; Moore's vocals received mixed reactions. A remix EP titled re:free was released on October 24, 2006, featuring remixes of three tracks from Free.

== Background ==
After the first OSI album, Office of Strategic Influence, was released in 2003, Jim Matheos and Kevin Moore returned to their respective projects. Matheos released the album FWX and toured with Fates Warning. Moore moved from Costa Rica to Istanbul, Turkey. In 2004, he released the third Chroma Key album, Graveyard Mountain Home, and wrote the soundtrack (released as Ghost Book) to the Turkish horror film Okul. Matheos and Moore both had holes in their schedules, so decided to work on a second OSI album.

The writing and recording process were largely the same as that for the first OSI album. Matheos would send Moore guitar, keyboard and programming parts; Moore would then "chop them up and stuff". Matheos considers the writing process for OSI as more collaborative than writing for his other band, Fates Warning: "With Fates I write songs and we don't really change a whole lot from my final version to the version that goes on the record," he said. "With Kevin it's much more collaborative in that I come up with a song idea and it can change completely from my original idea to the final product on the record."

Matheos originally intended the first OSI album as a "project" which would never produce a second album. For Free, Matheos and Moore wanted to use a different musician lineup to focus OSI on primarily being Matheos and Moore. They did not want to give the impression that the guests on the first album were part of the band. Matheos stated that the music on Free was "focused less on the progressive elements or the metal elements that were on the first record. We thought we could do something just a little more groove oriented." Matheos and Moore had both worked with bassist Joey Vera in the past and considered him "perfect" for the album. Moore was pleased with Vera's bass parts: Vera sent them to Moore in a state such that they required very little editing or enhancement for the final mix of the album.

Dream Theater drummer Mike Portnoy was listed as a full member of OSI on the first album, but found working on the first album to be a difficult experience. Moore noted that Portnoy "wasn't used to having other people have strong ideas about what the drum parts should be". For Free, Portnoy contributed drum tracks as a session musician, agreeing to "take [Matheos and Moore's] ideas and do the best he could with playing", according to Moore. Portnoy's drum parts were recorded at Carriage House Studios in Stamford, Connecticut from November 18 to 20, 2005.

== Composition ==
Moore stated that he and Matheos had an idea of what style of music to write for Free as they "both have similar feelings about what worked on the first album". He considered the album as "more focused" than its predecessor. He noted that Free continued "the mood of some of the songs of the first album and the melodies and mixing up some of the heavy stuff with the programming. As opposed to the instrumental, straight ahead, progressive stuff we did". He attributed the band's sound to the "very different" ideas he and Matheos' had.

Moore described the lyrics on the album as "just whatever is going on in my head... I try to development from a stream of consciousness to something that makes sense". He said the lyrics primarily spoke of relationships, "our way of trying to keep them, the resulting problems and that kind of thing". Moore cited Roger Waters and Peter Gabriel as influences on his vocal style, "Those guys don't have the best voices either, but they pull it off then I figured I could do it too," he said. He noted that musically his progressive influences "will always be there" because they influenced all his music, but could not name any other influences as "[he listens] to so much stuff it just gets lost".

Moore doubletracked his vocals, but apart from occasional use of delay did not use any effects on his vocals. He used an Elektron Monomachine and a Minimoog Voyager with computer software to produce the keyboard sounds on the album. Matheos detuned his guitars to C# and sometimes B instead of using a seven-string guitar because he prefers the sound of a detuned guitar: "To me, they sound totally different if you have those nice loose, floppy strings," he said. "It's a real bitch to keep them in tune, stopping every couple measures, retuning and punching back in. Especially for [a] song that's in B, or even C# is a problem sometimes, especially if you're doing a lot of fast moving around or high up on the neck. It's a pain in the ass, but I really like that sound. I don't think I would ever go to a 7-string."

The bonus track OSIdea 9 features audio clips of former chess world champion Robert 'Bobby' Fischer's rambling interview with a radio station after his arrest in Japan, in which he asserts that the U.S. government will torture and murder him once extradited back to the country.

== Release and promotion ==
Free was released by InsideOut Music on April 24, 2006. Matheos and Moore were keen to tour the US and Europe in the fall of 2006. In a 2009 interview, Moore reflected that "we tried to get together [to tour], but it just didn't happen".

The special edition of the album contained six extra songs: two were songs that didn't make it to the final album, but Matheos noted "were interesting nonetheless"; two tracks were songs Moore had written for Radio For Peace International. Another track was a demo of "When You're Ready", a track from Office of Strategic Influence. An EP entitled re:free was released on October 24, 2006. InsideOut Music released a CD version of the EP and Burning Shed released a vinyl version. The EP features the tracks "Go" (remixed by Console), "Kicking" and "Home Was Good" (both remixed by Moore) and a multimedia track of "Free".

== Reception ==
Professional ratings
Review scores
Source	Rating
About.com	3/5 stars
AllMusic	3/5 stars
Blogcritics	9/10 stars
PopMatters	5/10 stars
Prog4you.com	9/10 stars
Transcending the Mundane	(favorable)

Critical reception for Free was generally positive. Blogcritics praised the album as "a masterful evolution of the sound of two fabulous musicians", describing it as "a magnificent symbiosis of metal and experimental electronica." Jake Rosenberg of Transcending the Mundane stated that on Office of Strategic Influence, "it sounded like they were experimenting with different approaches, but never really established the OSI sound". He lauded Free for "[sounding] like the work of a mature and confident band". Adrien Begrand of PopMatters regarded Free as "a challenge to fans of both Fates Warning and Dream Theater, and one that will surprise those who think this is just another slice of flashy prog metal bombast."

Reviewers commented on the differences between Free and Office of Strategic Influence. Rosenberg described Free as "heavier, darker, more experimental and a lot more consistent" than the first album. Stewart Mason of AllMusic described the album as "downright commercial in a way that none of the duo's previous projects have been". He regarded the album as less like the "standard-issue epic metal" of the first album and more like "Evanescence's gothy metal-pop crossed with late-era Radiohead's fondness for electronic interference". He considered the songwriting as "catchy enough that it's not unthinkable that unadventurous rock radio programmers could take a shine to the title track or 'Go'", although noted that "Fates Warning and Dream Theater fans might be less impressed". Rosenberg considers Free as musically "a more progressive version of Nine Inch Nails. Instead of creating their darkness with angst and depression, OSI creates their darkness with sheer indifference." Begrand compared the album to Head Control System, "in that it tends to stray from the typical metal template in an attempt at something a little more electronic influenced". Although not considering Free to be as "enthralling" as Head Control System, he noted that the album "still has its moments".

Critics noted that there was a greater focus on Moore's keyboards than Matheos' guitar riffs. Blogcritics said that "Free focuses a lot on the keyboards and programming of Kevin Moore", although Matheos' "heavy guitar riffs, while not as frequent on this disc, have an even harder edge. They have an energy, and urgency, and serious metal crunch to them that will make any rocker sit up and pay attention." Chad Bower of About.com noted that Free "isn't one of those metal albums that hypes you up and makes you want to break stuff. It's one where you have to sit back, throw on the headphones, and appreciate the complexity and musicianship." Olav Björnsen of Prog4you.com stated that "layers upon layers of electronic sounds, that fill out the soundscapes of the songs, create nuances and subtle moods as well as walls of sound and tension." He said that Matheos used acoustic and electric guitars "to fill out the soundscapes even more, and is at the most effective when playing the acoustic guitar, giving life and warmth to songs that would have been a bit cold sounding without that input."

Bower described Moore's "laid back and relaxed" vocals as "[fitting] in perfectly with the atmospheric style music". Blogcritics praised Moore's vocals as being "in such stark contrast to the music that it serves to heighten the tension of the songs". Björnsen considered Moore's vocals as "an important asset" to the album: "He isn't a good vocalist when it comes to singing voice or range, but utilizes his talk-like singing effectively, binding together eleven quite different sounding songs." Rosenberg considered Moore's vocals and lyrics as "the thing that stands out the most", comparing him to Roger Waters. Mason dismissed Moore's vocals, describing them as "unfortunately reminiscent of any number of faceless alternative rock singers". Begrand criticized Moore's "monotonous droning" as "tiresome".

Mike Portnoy's drumming received praise. "Mike Portnoy continues to amaze with his adaptability, playing perfectly with just about whatever style of music," Blogcritics noted. Björnsen commended Portnoy's performance, noting that "He delivers driving rhythms when appropriate, and has a more laid back approach when necessary". Batmaz praised Portnoy for "displaying admirable restraint": "Free is perhaps his most minimalistic side, because of the thick atmosphere on the album, but at any rate, his performance his spectacular". Blogcritics praised Vera's bass parts as "[adding] extra strength and depth to the rhythm section."

Batmaz regarded "All Gone Now" as "arguably the best song", describing it as being "built upon a strong foundation of atmosphere and dynamics. Constantly shifting between mad riffage and daunting synth passages, this song features some of the finest melodies Kevin Moore has written since Awake. His synth melodies simply soar to high levels while Matheos' playing contrasts the eerie mood of the piece." Björnsen dismissed "Our Town" as "filler".

== Track listing ==
All lyrics are written by Kevin Moore; all music is composed by Jim Matheos and Kevin Moore, except where noted.

No.	Title	Length
1.	"Sure You Will"	3:46
2.	"Free"	3:22
3.	"Go"	4:16
4.	"All Gone Now"	5:15
5.	"Home Was Good"	5:03
6.	"Bigger Wave"	4:32
7.	"Kicking"	3:53
8.	"Better"	4:06
9.	"Simple Life"	4:00
10.	"Once"	6:38
11.	"Our Town"	3:20
Total length:		48:11

Special edition bonus disc

No.	Title	Length
1.	"OSIdea 9" (Matheos)	3:33
2.	"Set It on Fire" (Moore)	3:42
3.	"Communicant" (Matheos)	3:47
4.	"When You're Ready" (demo from Office of Strategic Influence)	3:09
5.	"Remain Calm" (Moore)	4:08
6.	"Old War" (Akdeniz)	1:06
Total length:		18:45

Re:free track listing

No.	Title	Length
1.	"Go" (Console Remix)	10:32
2.	"Kicking" (Kevin Moore Remix)	8:05
3.	"Home Was Good" (Kevin Moore Remix)	9:52
4.	"Free" (multimedia track)	5:00
Total length:		34:58

== Personnel ==
- Jim Matheos - guitars, keyboards and programming
- Kevin Moore - vocals, keyboards and programming
- Mike Portnoy - acoustic drums
- Joey Vera - bass on tracks 1, 2, 4, 6, and 7
- Bige Akdeniz - guitar and vocals on "Old War"
