= Graveyard Mountain Home =

Studio album by Chroma Key
- Released: November 8, 2004
- Length: 53:20
- Label: InsideOut Music
- Producer: Kevin Moore

Chroma Key chronology
You Go Now (2000)	Graveyard Mountain Home (2004)

Graveyard Mountain Home is the third studio album released under the name Chroma Key by American keyboardist Kevin Moore. It was released on November 8, 2004 by InsideOut Music. Moore originally started work on the album in 2003, planning to release a less electronica-influenced album than previous Chroma Key albums, but put it aside to work on the first OSI album. He then moved to Istanbul, Turkey, where he wrote Ghost Book, the soundtrack to the film Okul. Enjoying the experience of writing music to film, Moore scrapped his previous plans for the third Chroma Key album, instead writing an album as an alternate soundtrack to an already-existing film.

Moore found the social guidance film Age 13 in the Prelinger Archives, which served as his main inspiration. He slowed the film down to half its original playback speed to allow a full album to be written around the twenty-five-minute film. With complete creative control over the album, Moore was free to experiment, sometimes writing music "not necessarily to always match the images on the screen, but to sometimes play against it." The deluxe edition of the album contains the film in its full length, played at half speed, with the album as a soundtrack in place of the original audio.

Critical reception of Graveyard Mountain Home was generally positive. Critics noted that the album was a departure from Moore's previous works, and that it was best experienced as an alternate soundtrack to Age 13. Moore played songs from Graveyard Mountain Home live for the first time in a small club in Istanbul in 2007, and planned to tour more extensively in the future.

== Background ==
In an interview published in December 2003, Kevin Moore revealed that he had started work on a third Chroma Key album, but had put it aside to work on the first OSI album, Office of Strategic Influence. When Moore stopped working on Chroma Key material, he had already recorded two songs. "The big difference with the new [Chroma Key album] is that there are more real instruments," Moore said. "I've hooked up with a bunch of friends that made hand drums and didgeridoos. And I did a lot of recording with that. This new Chroma Key is going to be more organic, and less digital."

Theron Patterson, a friend of Moore's and former classmate at California Institute of the Arts, was working in Istanbul, Turkey and invited Moore to visit. Moore, who had been living in Costa Rica, stayed with him for two weeks, then decided to settle in Istanbul and record the third Chroma Key album there. Moore signed to InsideOut Records. "They've been really great supporting this; they sent me out to Turkey when I told them I wanted to record out there, basically supporting the whole process," he said. The first project Moore worked on after he moved to Istanbul was Ghost Book, the soundtrack to the Turkish film Okul. Moore enjoyed the experience and decided to write the third Chroma Key album as an alternate soundtrack to an already-existing film.

Moore decided to use a film in the public domain to avoid any rights issues. He looked through the Prelinger Archives to find a film which matched the mood he wanted for the Chroma Key album. One of the first films he found was the social guidance film Age 13. "It was kind of rich for musical accompaniment and the cinematography and everything is really beautiful, kind of surreal," Moore said. The film served as Moore's main inspiration and source of audio samples.

When deciding on musicians to perform on the album, Moore said that he "picked people who were around". His girlfriend, Bige Akdeniz, performed vocals, Theron Patterson did programming and Patterson's drum teacher, Utku Ünal, performed the drums. The only musician Moore actively sought out was guitarist Erdem Helvacıoğlu, who performed on one track. Moore noted that none of the music was technically demanding, "it's just more of a feel that we’re going for so it was just a matter of getting comfortable and getting in the mood and playing stuff together."

Moore ranked Graveyard Mountain Home as the most enjoyable project he had worked on up to that point. "I never felt like 'Oh fuck I have to finish this record, I have to do one more song, I have to do something to this song to make it better,'" Moore said. He described the process of making the album as feeling "more like I was playing with this film and I was playing against it so it felt easy somehow".

== Composition ==
Moore wrote music to Age 13 slowed down to half its original playback speed. This allowed him to write an album's worth of music around the twenty-five minute film and "made [the film] flow better". Moore primarily worked alone in his home studio, recording short song ideas. "I would place [the ideas] inside a theme in the film, just sort of audition things that might work, and something would click and I would develop the idea," Moore said. In contrast to Moore's original plan to record an "organic, and less digital" album, all of the sounds on Graveyard Mountain Home are digital.

Unlike in a traditional film soundtrack, Moore often wrote music "not necessarily to always match the images on the screen, but to sometimes play against it." Moore explained that a traditional soundtrack needs to convey the mood of the scene and advance the film's storyline, but that he did not have to do that with Graveyard Mountain Home "because the director's not around". "I thought, well what would it be like if I did a totally different kind of mood than this scene is trying to convey? When you put that music with that scene what happens there? Sometimes it's kind of interesting what happens," Moore explained.

== Release and promotion ==
Graveyard Mountain Home was released on November 8, 2004 by InsideOut Music. A special edition of the album, including a DVD with the film Age 13 on it, was also released. Moore originally planned to tour in support of Graveyard Mountain Home, but nothing materialized. In a 2005 interview, Moore said he was still trying to organize a tour. He was optimistic that he would play "at least a couple shows", but noted that getting the funding to tour made the process "a constant battle".

Moore performed his first solo show at a small club in Istanbul on March 23, 2007. The hour-long show consisted primarily of material from Graveyard Mountain Home, which was accompanied by projections of the corresponding scenes from Age 13. "I thought that it would be good for the first show to be sort of small and comfortable... so I thought we [could] just have a hundred people," Moore said. "Everybody can see, everybody can be comfortable and sort of enjoy themselves. And if something goes horribly wrong, it only happens in front of a hundred people." Moore hoped the show would form the basis of more elaborate, longer shows. He planned on playing more shows in Turkey, before touring Europe and the rest of the world.

== Reception ==
Professional ratings
Review scores
Source	Rating
Allmusic	4/5 stars
DPRP	5/10 stars
Sea of Tranquility	4/5 stars
Stream of Consciousness	7.5/10 stars

Graveyard Mountain Home was generally well received. Rick Anderson of Allmusic regarded the album as "a surprisingly affecting and powerful work." Writing for Sea of Tranquility, Michael Popke noted that "If you listen to Graveyard Mountain Home as a stand-alone piece of music... you probably won't be overly impressed. If, however, you hear this sophisticated mix of dark, ambient post-rock and psychedelic sounds while viewing the 1955 public-domain film Age 13, you may consider multi-instrumentalist Kevin Moore a small-time genius." Popke speculated that if Moore created more albums based on obscure films, "he might just alter the face of the genre." Martien Koolen of DPRP described Graveyard Mountain Home as "a typical album for dark, wintry afternoons," although conceded that "it is not [his] cup of tea."

Koolen described the music as having "absolutely no connection or Dream Theater influences whatsoever... Kevin Moore mixes dark ambient, post-rock and psychedelic music to create Chroma Key’s music." He compared the album's sound to that of Tortoise, Millenia Nova, Sigur Rós and early Pink Floyd. Anderson said that the album "sounds more like a twisted collaboration between Gábor Csupó and Muslimgauze than anything else you're likely to hear on the InsideOut label."

Rachel Jablonski of Stream of Consciousness described the overall feel of the album as "somewhat calm and bleak. Yet throughout, a distant brightness prevails whether via musical tone or mental imagery in a very subtle way." Anderson said that the music "at times is funky in a glitchy, herky-jerky sort of way... and at others is dark and meditative". He noted that there were some "traditional" songs on the album, singling out "Sad Sad Movie", which he described as "gorgeous". Koolen considered "Human Love" and "Andrew Was Drowning His Stepfather" to be the "weirdest songs... which can hardly be described as music".

Popke noted that although he saw little connection between the music and the film, Moore "expresses the mood of each scene brilliantly." He found that watching Age 13 with Graveyard Mountain Home as the soundtrack enhanced the film: "Age 13 is not necessarily an enjoyable film to watch... but viewing it with the Chroma Key soundtrack makes an odd experience even odder yet wholly compelling, with a mysterious filmstrip allure that freezes a bygone era." Conversely, Jablonski considered Age 13 as an enhancement to the music. "Listening to the album stand alone for the first time you may not be much impressed," she said. "The music is solemn and somewhat confusing as the tracks run from one to another without much build and in seemingly senseless patterns... Having previously seen or simultaneously watching Age 13 most definitely would help the listener along."

== Track listing ==
All songs written and composed by Kevin Moore, except where noted.

No.	Title	Length
1.	"YYY"	2:11
2.	"Give Up"	4:04
3.	"White Robe"	4:55
4.	"Mother's Radio" (Moore, Theron Patterson)	4:15
5.	"Graveyard Mountain Home"	2:32
6.	"Salvation"	2:40
7.	"Before You Started"	4:24
8.	"Human Love" (Moore, Patterson)	6:01
9.	"Come In, Over" (Bige Akdeniz, Moore)	5:01
10.	"Pure Laughter"	2:08
11.	"Andrew Was Drowning His Stepfather"	2:12
12.	"Sad Sad Movie"	5:38
13.	"True and Lost" (Akdeniz, Moore)	2:30
14.	"Again Today" (Moore, Patterson)	4:45
Total length:		53:20

== Personnel ==
- Kevin Moore – vocals, guitars, keyboards, programming
- Utku Ünal – drums
- Theron Patterson – programming on tracks 2, 8, and 14; bass
- Bige Akdeniz – additional vocals on tracks 9 and 13
- Bob Nekrasov – monologue on track 8
- Erdem Helvacıoğlu – additional guitar on track 3
