= Office of Strategic Influence (album) =

Studio album by OSI
- Released: February 17, 2003
- Recorded: June 2–9, 2002
- Studio: Carriage House Studios (Stamford, Connecticut)
- Genre: Progressive rock, progressive metal
- Length: 47:28 (standard edition); 76:07 (limited edition)
- Label: InsideOut
- Producer: Jim Matheos and Kevin Moore

OSI chronology
| Office of Strategic Influence (2003) | Free (2006) |

Office of Strategic Influence is the first studio album by American progressive rock band OSI, released by Inside Out Music on February 18, 2003. The album was recorded in June 2002 and mixed in August 2002 at the Carriage House Studios in Stamford, Connecticut.

Fates Warning guitarist Jim Matheos originally recruited Dream Theater drummer Mike Portnoy to work on a progressive metal album. When keyboardist and vocalist Kevin Moore (founder of Chroma Key and former Dream Theater member) joined the project, the musical direction of the album changed to become more focused on soundscapes and composition than musicianship. Sean Malone (of Cynic and Gordian Knot) and Steven Wilson (of Porcupine Tree) also performed on the album.

The album is named after the Office of Strategic Influence, an organization set up after the September 11 attacks to spread misinformation and plant false news items in the media, among other functions. The Office was shut after The New York Times published a story on it; many of its operations were transferred to the Information Operations Task Force. The album's lyrics were written by Moore in reaction to the September 11 attacks.

Critical reception of the album was generally positive, praising the band's musicianship. Critics compared the band's sound to Porcupine Tree. Portnoy was ultimately dissatisfied with the experience of making the album. He performed on the second OSI album, Free, but was replaced by Gavin Harrison for Blood and Fire Make Thunder, the band's third and fourth albums respectively.

== Background ==
Fates Warning guitarist Jim Matheos originally started work on Office of Strategic Influence as a side project while his bandmates took a break before starting work on their next album. Matheos decided to work with Dream Theater drummer Mike Portnoy because the two had wanted to work on a project together for some time. They originally planned to form a supergroup, envisaging the album as "straight prog metal".

Matheos spent seven months writing material for the album. He then sent Kevin Moore (who was living in Costa Rica) some MP3 files of the music he had written and asked him to write some keyboard parts. Moore (known as a founding member of Dream Theater and for his solo career as Chroma Key) had previously performed on three Fates Warning albums, and Matheos was expecting him to write keyboard parts as he had for the Fates Warning album. Instead, Moore "messed with [Matheos'] tracks and switched things around and put vocals to it and stuff like that." He said that he no longer considered the keyboard, bass and guitar parts separate from each other: "I don't write like that any more as much as I'm composing a whole song." The resulting track would become "Hello, Helicopter!"

Moore emailed his work back to Matheos, who was "pleasantly surprised" to be sent something completely different from what he expected. Matheos wanted to create a heavy album; before deciding to takes Moore's ideas further, Matheos and Moore wrote what would become "OSI". Moore said that after that, "[Matheos] was pretty much comfortable with whatever I wanted to do." This new song format was very different from what Portnoy and Matheos originally planned: the already-written long tracks were split into multiple short songs, closer to Moore's project Chroma Key than traditional progressive metal. "The Thing That Never Was", a track on the bonus disc, shows the direction Matheos and Portnoy originally planned to take the album in.

Matheos and Portnoy initially considered having a different vocalist perform on each track; this idea was scrapped as they decided the constant change in vocalist would disrupt the flow of the album. Vocalists considered included Steve Walsh, Steve Hogarth, Steven Wilson and John Arch. Portnoy particularly pushed for Daniel Gildenlöw to sing on the album. Early on in the album's production, Gildenlöw wrote some vocal melodies and lyrics for two songs and completely wrote another song. Matheos liked Gildenlöw's ideas, but did not want to take the music in the same direction Gildenlöw did. Moore ended up performing most of the vocals on the album. In order to keep the album from becoming too similar to Chroma Key, Matheos and Portnoy decided to feature a guest vocalist on one track. Steven Wilson (of Porcupine Tree) wrote lyrics and performed vocals on the track "ShutDOWN". He was chosen because his music in Porcupine Tree was similar in style to the music on the album. Portnoy also credited Wilson as "a pioneer of his genre".

Bassist Sean Malone (of Cynic and Gordian Knot) was only credited as a guest musician. Portnoy explained that this was because Malone's schedule did not allow him to join Matheos, Moore and Portnoy in the basic tracking sessions.

== Recording ==
Office of Strategic Influence was recorded at Carriage House Studios in Stamford, Connecticut from June 2 to 9, 2002. Matheos and Moore mixed the album with Phil Magnotti (who had previously mixed for Fates Warning) in August. Portnoy pushed to get as much of the band together as possible for the main tracking sessions because of his dislike of "side projects done through mail."

Matheos and Moore created the basic song ideas in Pro Tools. Songs in the progressive metal vein were almost entirely written by Matheos, while Moore had more influence on the more vocal-driven tracks. Portnoy noted that they were ultimately "Jim's songs", but that Moore was very involved with arrangements, post-production, melodies and lyrics. Portnoy considered himself as "just a drummer": he made minor arrangement suggestions but did not have a part in the actual writing. Malone and Wilson contributed their parts after the songs had been arranged. Matheos saved any unused ideas for the next Fates Warning album.

Sean Malone said that he enjoyed playing on the album, but that "it would have been nice to work out parts with Mike as they were being recorded rather than after the fact". He took a "session approach" to the album, "trying as much as possible to create parts that fit what Jim et al had created, versus trying to impose anything upon it". He was sent MIDI bass parts for each song which served as a guideline. For the particularly sparse and texture-heavy tracks, Malone did much doubletracking to create "a natural kind of chorusing" he prefers to any digital effects.

Before the recording of Office of Strategic Influence, the last time Moore and Portnoy worked together was on Dream Theater's Awake in 1994. Matheos was initially concerned about how Moore and Portnoy would feel about working together for the first time in eight years. Moore noted that he and Portnoy were not on bad terms, but "just weren't in touch." The two both described the experience as initially "awkward". When recording the album Portnoy had to take directions from others; he found this difficult as he was used to taking the creative lead. Moore noted that there was tension when recording the same drum part for a song more than once (in order to give Moore choice later on): "He's used to just playing the stroke once, the way he wants to," he said.

In a 2009 interview, Portnoy blamed his frustration with the project on Moore:

I honestly went in there with an open mind and I was truly excited to work with Kevin again... But it ended up being more of the same old shit that it was when he left Dream Theater... making those records [Office of Strategic Influence and Free] with Kevin wasn't fun. He's not a fun person to work with. He's a very depressing and stubborn personality and there's no reason in my life or my career that I need to subject myself to that sort of personality.

Portnoy performed as a session musician on the second OSI album, Free, but was replaced by Porcupine Tree drummer Gavin Harrison for the third album, Blood.

== Music ==
"OSI"
"OSI" demonstrates both the electronic and metal aspects of the album. This excerpt is taken from one minute forty-five seconds onwards.

Moore described the music on Office of Strategic Influence as "a new approach to progressive rock", stating that he could use his musical roots in progressive music but "was far enough away from it to play with it." He said that "progressive rock has been around for so long and we have to stop taking it so seriously and really have fun with it." Portnoy described the album as "more soundscapish" than his work in Dream Theater, focusing more on composition and sounds than musicianship. He noted the style "would never work in Dream Theater."

Moore wrote lyrics for the album by "mumbling along to the song and then deciphering what I'm saying." The lyrics feature political themes ("Hello, Helicopter!" is about the US supplying military arsenals to other countries to protect its own national interests), although Matheos stated that the album was not political in nature. Moore said that he writes lyrics based on personal experiences, and that much of the album's lyrical content stems from how the September 11 attacks affected him. Moore's brother was a firefighter who worked at the World Trade Center after the attacks, "and I was totally apolitical before this, politically naïve and I still am," Moore stated. "I was like, 'Whoa, what the fuck is going on in the world?'"

Office of Strategic Influence features Moore's signature use of spoken word samples. He collected samples first and then tried to match them with the song's tempo. Moore said that the samples relate directly to the song's lyrics.

Matheos listed his influences as progressive rock bands such as Genesis, Jethro Tull and Emerson, Lake & Palmer and heavy metal bands such as Black Sabbath, UFO and Uriah Heep. Moore described his influences as minimal techno, experimental electronic musicians and "bands that play live and then chop it up". He specifically named Pole, The Gordons and Acid Undertones as influences. Malone cited Mick Karn as an influence.

== Release and promotion ==
Moore chose the album's name from a list of band, album and song names he kept. The Office of Strategic Influence was a highly secret organization set up three weeks after the September 11 attacks. Part of its mission was to spread misinformation and plant false news items in the media in order to "influence the hearts and minds of the opposition." After The New York Times ran a story on the Office in February 2002, it was forced to shut, although many of its operations were later transferred to the Information Operations Task Force. "The funny thing about it was the government and administration was saying it's so embarrassing that they had to name it the 'Office of Strategic Influence,' we couldn't just put it in a room in the Pentagon and name it whatever the room number is," Moore said. "Someone decided to be really creative about it and name it what it really is."

The limited edition bonus CD features three bonus tracks on it. There are two cover songs: a cover of the Pink Floyd song "Set the Controls for the Heart of the Sun" performed by Moore and Portnoy, chosen because they both "love Pink Floyd", according to Portnoy, and a cover of the Neil Young song "New Mama" performed by Moore. The third track, entitled "The Thing That Never Was", is a seventeen-minute instrumental performed by Matheos and Portnoy, showing the original direction they intended to take the album in. The CD contains a 19-minute multimedia section, including two documentary-style videos shot during the album's recording, and a music video for the track "Horseshoes and B-52s" directed by Moore.

Matheos suggested using an altered version of the United States passport for the album's cover art. The differences are that the arrows are double-headed, the olive branch is wilted, and the eagle's wings have been clipped. Matheos, Moore and Portnoy decided against sending out promotional copies of the album before its release date in order to prevent an early Internet leak of it. The album was released in Europe on February 17, 2003.

== Reception ==
Professional ratings
Review scores
| Source | Rating |
|---|---|
| AllMusic | 4/5 stars |
| Prog4you.com | (8.5/10) |
| ProgressiveWorld.net | (favorable) |

Office of Strategic Influence was critically well received. Keith Gordon of AllMusic praised the album as "offering both power and pomp." Tommy Hash of Prog4you.com described the music as "catchy, complete with great melodies and musicianship that does not overdo it." He described the album as "almost in complete contrast to the parent bands' other related side projects," such as Liquid Tension Experiment and Transatlantic. John Bollenberg of ProgressiveWorld.net praised Matheos, Moore and Portnoy for "[starting] from scratch without copying their past in order to deliver something fresh, new and exciting."

Hash described the album as having "the atmosphere of some of the mid-90s to the latter era Fates Warning fused with industrial sounding elements and sound effects that create an ambient effect." Gordon described the music as similar to Pink Floyd, King Crimson and Max Vague. Bollenberg noted "the material on Office Of Strategic Influence gets closer to Moore's very own Chroma Key mixed with dashes of latterday Porcupine Tree... there are bits and bobs all over the album that could easily have fit on In Absentia."

Gordon described the performances on the album as "crackling with electricity and passion". He lauded Matheos' performance on the album: "In any other subgenre of rock, Matheos would be a guitar hero on the order of Steve Vai or Eddie Van Halen, the Fates Warning frontman capable of both classically styled acoustic craftsmanship and chaotic metallic riffing, often in the context of the same song." He praised Malone and Portnoy for "[holding] down the bottom line with rock-solid rhythms".

Gordon praised Moore for "providing an instrumental counterpoint to Matheos' raging guitar. Moore's imaginative style and natural skill coax a myriad of sounds from his instrument to challenge Matheos in the mix." Sander noted Moore's contribution, saying that "at times there's more technology and electronics than in the average house release". Bollenberg noted that Moore's keyboards added "textures flirting with semi-industrial patches and often being closer to Nine Inch Nails than 'vintage' melodic prog." Hash praised Moore's vocals, noting they "fit in well with all of the instrumental textures". In contrast, Sander criticized Moore's voice as "dull": "the many added distortion and echo effects cannot always make it more interesting. His voice is okay for one or two tracks... but it's too flat to keep you tied to the speakers for much longer". He cited Moore's vocals as the main weakness of some tracks.

Bollenberg listed his favorite track as "Hello, Helicopter!": "it once again gets so very close to authentic Porcupine Tree with Portnoy introducing some tribal rhythms that go ever so well with the rest of the material. I simply melt once that superb sound of the Fender Rhodes enters, taking turns with synthesizer tweaks." Gordon described the instrumental parts of the album as "powerful and purposeful: an integral part of each composition rather than an excuse to merely 'jam'".

== Track listing ==
All tracks are written by Jim Matheos and Kevin Moore, except where noted.

| No. | Title | Length |
|---|---|---|
| 1. | "The New Math (What He Said)" (Matheos; instrumental) | 3:36 |
| 2. | "OSI" | 3:48 |
| 3. | "When You're Ready" | 3:09 |
| 4. | "Horseshoes and B-52's" (Instrumental) | 4:18 |
| 5. | "Head" | 5:19 |
| 6. | "Hello, Helicopter!" | 3:44 |
| 7. | "ShutDOWN" (Music: Matheos; Lead vocals and lyrics: Steven Wilson) | 10:24 |
| 8. | "Dirt from a Holy Place" (Matheos; instrumental) | 5:10 |
| 9. | "Memory Daydreams Lapses" | 5:56 |
| 10. | "Standby (Looks Like Rain)" | 2:11 |
| Total length: | | 47:28 |

=== Limited edition bonus CD ===
| No. | Title | Length |
|---|---|---|
| 1. | "Set the Controls for the Heart of the Sun" (Pink Floyd cover) | 8:49 |
| 2. | "New Mama" (Neil Young cover) | 2:24 |
| 3. | "The Thing That Never Was" (Instrumental) | 17:21 |
| Total length: | | 28:36 |

== Personnel ==
- Jim Matheos – guitars, keyboards, programming, producer, engineering
- Kevin Moore – vocals, keyboards, programming, producer
- Sean Malone – bass guitar, Chapman stick
- Mike Portnoy – drums
- Steven Wilson – vocals on "ShutDOWN"
- Produced by Jim Matheos and Kevin Moore
- Mixed by Phil Magnotti
- Engineered by Phil Magnotti, Steven Wilson, Sean Malone and Jim Matheos

== Chart positions ==
| Chart (2003) | Peak position |
|---|---|
| Billboard Independent Albums | 31 |
| French charts | 149 |
