= Beto Cuevas discography =

- Studio albums: 1
- Singles: 2

Beto Cuevas is the former songwriter, lead singer, and sometimes guitarist of the Chilean band La Ley, before they broke up in 2005. He was born in Santiago, Chile, and now resides in Los Angeles, California. He released 8 studio albums with La Ley, including a greatest hits compilation and a live album.

== Solo studio albums ==
Year	Album	Chart positions			Sales/certification
Year	Album	U.S. Latin	U.S. Heat	MEX	Sales/certification
2008	Miedo Escenico: Debut album; Release Date: September 23, 2008; Formats: CD, digital download	33	10	8	RIAA: ABPD: U.S. sales:
2012	Transformación: Release Date: September 25, 2012; Formats: CD, digital download	38	—	10	
2019	Colateral: Release Date: November 22, 2019				

== Singles ==
Title	Year	Peak Position											Album
Title	Year	ARG	MEX	CHI	ECU	BOL	URU	COL	PAR	LA	U.S. Latin	U.S. Pop Latin	Album
"Vuelvo"	2008	13	6	3	1	15	5	48	1	7	47	20	Miedo Escenico
"Háblame"	2008	13	16	4	—	—	—	—	—	29	—	27	Miedo Escenico
"El Cínico"	2009	37	—	—	—	—	16	—	—	—	—	—	Miedo Escenico
"Un Minuto de Silencio"	2009	16	2	—	—	13	24	18	7	—	—	—	Miedo Escenico
"Gracias a la Vida"	2010	5	24	20	—	—	—	8	—	—	17	—	—N/a
"Quiero creer" (featuring Flo Rida)	2012	—	8	42	—	—	—	—	—	—	32	14	Transformación
"Goodbye" (featuring Leire Martínez)	2012	—	—	—	—	—	—	—	—	—	—	—	Transformación
"Live from Japan"	2012	—	—	—	—	—	—	—	—	—	—	—	Transformación
