= This Is a Recording (Kevin Moore album) =

Studio album by Kevin Moore
- Released: 1999
- Genre: Electronica
- Length: 66:20
- Producer: Kevin Moore

Kevin Moore chronology
This Is a Recording (1999)	Memory Hole 1 (2004)

This Is a Recording contains demos from the years 1994–1997. It is out of print, and Kevin Moore has publicly said that there will be no reprint.

== Track listing ==
All music and lyrics by Kevin Moore, except "The Fucking Mouse" lyrics by Todd Farrington.

No.	Title	Length
1.	"Squelch"	2:01
2.	"Hay Day. May Day. Help."	4:28
3.	"Wednesday the Sky"	4:44
4.	"Roll Away the Stone"	3:46
5.	"Nora"	4:58
6.	"On the Page" (early version)	4:25
7.	"Blusong"	4:28
8.	"S.O.S."	7:24
9.	"Because the Plane Crashed"	3:00
10.	"The Fucking Mouse"	5:11
11.	"Shallow"	3:04
12.	"Hollow"	4:54
13.	"On the Page" (from 1995 Chroma Key demo)	4:17
14.	"Watercolor" (from 1995 Chroma Key demo)	4:22
15.	"Chromakey" (from 1995 Chroma Key demo)	5:18

== Song information ==
"Hay Day. May Day. Help", "Roll Away The Stone", "Nora", "Shallow" and "Hollow" are the remastered versions of songs previously released on Moore's demo tape titled Music Meant to Be Heard, which was distributed through Dream Theater fan clubs in 1995. "Hay Day. May Day. Help" was titled "Normal Words" on the original demo.

"Wednesday The Sky" is musically an early version of the song "S.O.S" from Chroma Key's first album Dead Air for Radios, although lyrically it's completely different.

"On The Page" (Track 6), "S.O.S" and "The Fucking Mouse" are the early versions of the songs (the latter being re-titled to "Mouse (Now Watch What Happens)") from Dead Air for Radios. "On The Page" (Track 13), "Watercolor" and "Chromakey" were recorded as Chroma Key in 1995, the latter two songs not making to the final version of Dead Air for Radios.

"Squelch", "Blusong" and "Because The Plane Crashed" appear only on This Is a Recording. "Because The Plane Crashed" is linked to "The Fucking Mouse" by the answering machine recording samples.

== Personnel ==
- Kevin Moore – keyboards, programming, bass, vocals, production
- Rich Kern – guitar on tracks 2, 4, 5, 11, 12
- Greg Cathcart – guitar on track 14
- Mark Zonder – drums on tracks 13–15
- Björk – sampled vocals on track 11
- Steve Tushar – mastering
