= This Is a Recording =

This Is a Recording may refer to:

- This Is a Recording (Kevin Moore album)
- This Is a Recording (Lily Tomlin album)
- Intercept message, a telephone recording informing the caller that the call cannot be completed
