= You Go Now =

Studio album by Chroma Key
- Released: November 14, 2000
- Length: 39:13
- Label: Fight Evil Records
- Producer: Kevin Moore, Steve Tushar

Chroma Key chronology
Dead Air for Radios (1998)	You Go Now (2000)	Graveyard Mountain Home (2004)

Professional ratings
Review scores
Source	Rating
Allmusic	2/5 stars
The Daily Vault	(A)
ProgressiveWorld.net	(not rated)
MusicTap	4/5 stars

You Go Now is the second solo album by keyboardist Kevin Moore, former member of Dream Theater. Moore recorded and released this album under the name Chroma Key. A number of initial pre-orders for the album in the Summer of 2000 were signed by Moore.

== Track listing ==
All tracks are written by Kevin Moore.

No.	Title	Length
1.	"Get Back in the Car"	5:04
2.	"Another Permanent Address"	5:05
3.	"Nice to Know"	4:30
4.	"Lunar"	3:14
5.	"When You Drive"	5:26
6.	"Subway"	4:23
7.	"Please Hang Up"	1:59
8.	"Astronaut Down"	4:36
9.	"You Go Now"	4:56

== Personnel ==
- Kevin Moore - Producer, vocals, keyboards, bass, drums
- Steve Tushar - Producer, co-writer, programming, additional guitars, additional keyboards
- David Iscove - guitars
