= Blood (OSI album) =

Studio album by OSI
- Released: April 27, 2009
- Recorded: 2008
- Genre: Progressive metal
- Length: 47:40 (standard); 69:02 (extended)
- Label: InsideOut
- Producer: Jim Matheos, Kevin Moore

OSI chronology
| Free (2006) | Blood (2009) | Fire Make Thunder (2012) |

Blood is the third studio album by American progressive rock band OSI, released by InsideOut Music on April 27, 2009, in Europe and May 19, 2009, in North America.

Guitarist Jim Matheos and keyboardist and vocalist Kevin Moore started work on the album in 2008, collaborating by email. Matheos would send Moore a song idea which Moore would edit and send back to Matheos. Mike Portnoy of Dream Theater, who performed drums on Office of Strategic Influence and Free, was replaced by Porcupine Tree drummer Gavin Harrison on Blood. Matheos played bass guitar on the album, having hired guest musicians to perform bass duties on the first two OSI albums. Mikael Åkerfeldt of Opeth and Tim Bowness of No-Man wrote lyrics and performed vocals on one track each.

Critical reception of Blood was generally positive. The more atmospheric and ambient tracks were praised; the more metal-oriented tracks received mixed reactions. Moore's lyrics and Harrison's drumming, in particular, were met with acclaim.

== Background ==
On September 4, 2008, keyboardist and vocalist Kevin Moore posted a news update to the official Chroma Key website. In it, he stated that he had been working with guitarist Jim Matheos on a third OSI album "for several months now, slowly but surely." Moore later stated that with OSI, he and Matheos "usually play it by ear. We never really know if we're going to do another OSI, we never agree on it. I don't remember ever agreeing to start a new one, really. But Jim will send me an idea or something and we just start talking about it."

Blood was written and recorded in the same way as the first two OSI albums. Matheos and Moore worked together on the album long-distance, mainly by emailing each other files. Matheos would send Moore song ideas, "from just a guitar riff to elaborate, almost completed songs," Moore said. "Then I ask what I can do, and I mess around, complete a verse and add a chorus, do editing, add some vocals, and send it back to him."

Moore considered the writing of Blood to be harder compared to previous OSI albums. Previously, Matheos would send Moore guitar parts to work with, allowing Moore to "work with editing them, pitching them, and fucking about them different ways, and then programming drums and keyboards." When working on Blood, Matheos also provided programming, keyboard and drum parts. "If he sent me stuff that already had drums and keyboard parts, and it wasn't a complete idea, I had to figure out a way to elaborate on it without having that same equipment that he has there," Moore said. Overall, he considered the writing process to be "smoother because we got on a roll and we're more fluid together".

Mike Portnoy of Dream Theater played drums on Office of Strategic Influence and Free, but found the experience frustrating. Moore regarded Portnoy's contributions to the first two albums as "great", but he and Matheos decided to recruit a different drummer for Blood. "We were continuing to try to get new voices involved with the album", he explained. Matheos, a fan of Porcupine Tree, was in control of personnel on Blood and asked Porcupine Tree drummer Gavin Harrison to perform drums on the album. Harrison had a schedule gap in the fourth quarter of 2008, so agreed to work on the album. He never met Matheos and Moore, recording his drums parts in his recording studio in England and exchanging files with them over the Internet. Most songs were sent to Harrison with programmed drums. "For the most part, we usually told him to try to stay away from the programmed drums and come up with his own parts, and he did. So much of that is his taking it in a different direction," Moore said. "There was probably at least one song, maybe two, where we said 'We'd like you to keep closer to the programmed drums,' but he had a lot of say in what went on." Matheos and Moore were "very happy" with Harrison's work on Blood, and hoped to work with him on the fourth OSI album. Blood marked the first time Matheos played bass on an OSI album instead of recruiting an outside bassist.

Matheos asked Opeth vocalist and guitarist Mikael Åkerfeldt to write lyrics and perform vocals on one track, which would become "Stockholm". Matheos and Moore sent him the track they wanted him to work on, and he sent back a rough mix of his vocals. "We were really happy with it," Moore said. "We didn't do any revisions or ask for any changes, like we were expecting to... It was a different approach than I would have taken, and that's what was refreshing about it. That's why we wanted to get somebody else to do some vocals on the album." Tim Bowness of No-Man wrote lyrics and performed vocals on "No Celebrations", a bonus track.

== Music ==
Moore regarded Blood as "[distilling] the OSI vibe that we've been going for all along with this album". He noted that there was "conflict" due to his and Matheos' different musical tastes, "but it's not a personality conflict. It's a musical conflict where we want different things to happen and have to work it musically." Moore considered this conflict to be "pretty much the only thing that makes OSI relatively original. If it was just one way or the other, like the singer-songwriter stuff, electronic music or progressive metal, there's a lot of people doing those things already."

Moore stated that he found writing songs which combined progressive metal and electronic music easier than writing songs confined to one genre. "There's people who do that better. Working with the two genres, they're different enough from each other – almost natural enemies – that it keeps it interesting," he said. "It doesn't feel like being in conquered territory, it feels like there's still room to explore. There's always conflicts between the two writing elements that keeps it interesting."

When writing lyrics for previous releases, Moore would "start mumbling and I try to figure out what I'm saying and then try to make it make sense". With Blood, he "really wrote them down and tried to make them coherent. I didn't want it to be like 'Oh, you get your own impression of the lyrics. Everybody has their own idea!' I wanted to have an idea that I wanted to communicate, and something communicable." Moore noted that he did occasionally use his "mumbling" method as it "puts you in the right direction as far as sounds, vowel sounds, and stresses on certain syllables. And if you can write some words and lyrics that match that, sometimes it flows really well." He described all the songs as based on "personal experiences". "I'll start writing a song that has a little bit of a world view or political view or something," he said, "but then by the time I'm finished the lyrics it'll be about a relationship or something like that."

Matheos recorded his parts in Pro Tools using a FocusRite Saffire PRO 40 preamp. Matheos primarily used PRS guitars and Mesa Boogie amplifiers. Moore used Ableton Live to write music and record his vocals. The only keyboard he used was a Minimoog Voyager.

== Release and promotion ==
Blood was released by InsideOut Music on April 27, 2009, in Europe and May 19 in North America. Matheos and Moore unsuccessfully tried to organise a tour in support of Free. "We sort of disappointed people by saying that we were trying to making [a tour] happen and we wanted to make it happen," Moore said, "so this time we're not going to say that stuff." Moore stated that OSI would remain a studio-only project "until further notice".

The special edition of Blood came with a bonus disc featuring three extra tracks. Tim Bowness (of No-Man) wrote lyrics and performed vocals on the first song, "No Celebrations". The second track is a cover of "Christian Brothers" by Elliott Smith. The third track is "Terminal (Endless)", an extended version of the regular CD track "Terminal". "It still has something interesting drum stuff where Gavin just plays steady beats with variations on it," Moore said. "We had some mercy on the album version, but on the bonus CD, we don't have any mercy and we just let it go."

== Reception ==
Professional ratings
Review scores
| Source | Rating |
|---|---|
| Allmusic | 3.5/5 stars |
| Blogcritics | (favorable) |
| MadeLoud | 4/5 stars |

Critical reception of Blood was generally positive. Writing for Blogcritics, Marty Dodge praised the album as "jaw droppingly impressive", considering it to "[have] the potential to be up there in top albums of the year". Andrew Reilly of MadeLoud lauded Blood as OSI's best album, although considered other individual songs from the band's catalog to be stronger than those on the album. Alex Henderson of Allmusic regarded Blood as "an album that falls short of earth-shattering but is still solid and worthwhile".

Reilly described Blood as "fully mastering the techno-informed brand of progressive metal so many others have pursued to no avail... with Blood the two have finally found the stylistic fusion their first two discs hinted at". Henderson described the sound of the album as "Pink Floyd and King Crimson by way of Radiohead, Nirvana, grunge, alt-metal and alt rock."

Reilly lauded Moore's lyrics, describing them as closer to his work in Dream Theater and Chroma Key than on the first two OSI albums. "Moore turns conventional phrases... into thinly-veiled warnings to some unknown subject," Reilly commented. "OSI has long been Moore's avenue for exploring the political as the personal, but here those two subjects fully cannibalize each other which, given this group's past efforts and considerable talents, would not at all be an impossible intention or unforeseen consequence." He praised Gavin Harrison's drum performance, describing it as "phenomenal". He considered "Stockholm" and "Blood" to be the highlights of the album. Dodge praised "Radiologue" as "stunning".

== Track listing ==
All lyrics are written by Kevin Moore, except where noted; all music is composed by Jim Matheos and Kevin Moore, except where noted.

| No. | Title | Length |
|---|---|---|
| 1. | "The Escape Artist" | 5:51 |
| 2. | "Terminal" | 6:29 |
| 3. | "False Start" | 3:04 |
| 4. | "We Come Undone" | 4:03 |
| 5. | "Radiologue" | 6:05 |
| 6. | "Be the Hero" | 5:51 |
| 7. | "Microburst Alert" (Matheos; instrumental) | 3:49 |
| 8. | "Stockholm" (Lyrics: Mikael Åkerfeldt) | 6:41 |
| 9. | "Blood" | 5:24 |
| Total length: | | 47:40 |

Special edition bonus disc

| No. | Title | Length |
|---|---|---|
| 1. | "No Celebrations" (Lyrics: Tim Bowness) | 6:27 |
| 2. | "Christian Brothers" (Elliott Smith cover) | 4:34 |
| 3. | "Terminal (Endless)" | 10:21 |
| Total length: | | 21:22 |

== Personnel ==
- Jim Matheos – guitar, bass, keyboards, programming
- Kevin Moore – vocals, keyboards, programming
- Gavin Harrison – drums
- Mikael Åkerfeldt – vocals on "Stockholm"
- Tim Bowness – vocals on "No Celebrations"
- Produced by Jim Matheos and Kevin Moore
- Mixed by Phil Magnotti, Jim Matheos and Kevin Moore
