= Kevin Moore =

American keyboardist (born 1967)

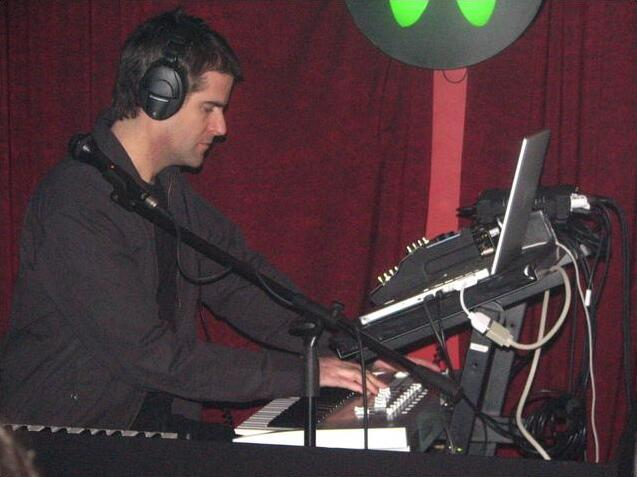
- Moore at Balo Stage, Istanbul, 2007

Background information
- Also known as: Chroma Key
- Born: May 26, 1967 (age 59); Long Island, New York, U.S.
- Genres: Electronic rock; art rock; heavy metal; progressive metal; progressive rock
- Occupations: Musician; composer
- Instruments: Keyboards; vocals
- Years active: 1985–present
- Member of: Chroma Key
- Formerly of: O.S.I.; Dream Theater; Fates Warning

Kevin Moore (born May 26, 1967) is an American keyboardist, composer, psychiatrist and the founder of the Chroma Key music project. He was also a member of the progressive metal band Dream Theater, co-founder of the progressive rock supergroup O.S.I., and a composer of film soundtracks. Throughout his career, he has become known for his emotional music and lyrics, nomadic lifestyle and use of spoken word samples.

Moore started his music career in progressive metal band Dream Theater. He contributed music and lyrics to the band's first three studio albums, but left the band during the mixing process of Awake to pursue his own musical interests. Starting with 1998's Dead Air for Radios, he has released electronica, ambient music through his solo project Chroma Key. Moore has guested on several albums, including three Fates Warning albums. This led Moore to form OSI with Fates Warning guitarist Jim Matheos in 2002, a band which combines progressive metal with electronica. The fourth OSI album, Fire Make Thunder, was released in March 2012.

Moore has worked on other solo projects since leaving Dream Theater. While living in Costa Rica, he produced a bi-weekly radio program for Radio for Peace International; a compilation of this work was released as Memory Hole 1. While living in Turkey, Moore produced the debut album of Turkish band Makine and wrote soundtracks for two Turkish films. The soundtrack for the first film, Okul, was released in 2004 as Ghost Book. The soundtrack for the second film, Küçük Kiyamet, entitled Shine, was released in 2010.

== Early years ==
Moore, who was born on Long Island, New York, began his music career in Kings Park, Long Island, learning piano at the age of six and writing his first song at the age of 12. After graduating from high school in 1985, Moore briefly attended SUNY Fredonia, where he studied classical music, before returning home to form the band Majesty with childhood friends guitarist John Petrucci and bassist John Myung, who had recruited drummer Mike Portnoy (a fellow Long Islander) during their short enrollment at Berklee College of Music. Singer Chris Collins handled vocal duties for Majesty, but he was subsequently replaced by Charlie Dominici (and eventually James LaBrie) and the band was renamed Dream Theater.

== Career ==
=== Dream Theater ===
Dream Theater's debut studio album was 1989's When Dream and Day Unite, which earned the group comparisons to well-known progressive rock bands such as Rush and Queensrÿche. Their big breakthrough, however, came in 1992 with the album Images and Words, featuring the band's highest charting single to date, "Pull Me Under". The song, which included lyrics by Moore, reached No. 10 on the Billboard Mainstream Rock Tracks chart. Following their relentless touring in support of the second album, the band also went on to release a live album, Live at the Marquee, and a video, Images and Words: Live In Tokyo. The video's extensive documentary footage would subsequently introduce many fans to Moore's ironic sense of humor.

In 1994, the band released its third studio album, Awake, which was the band's highest charting album to date with Moore, reaching No. 32. The album featured Moore's signature song, a haunting piano-driven ballad called "Space-Dye Vest". Shortly before the album was mixed, though, Moore announced to the rest of the band that he wished to concentrate on his own musical interests and would be quitting Dream Theater. According to Portnoy, Moore became interested in the independence of working on his own as opposed to the compromise of a band environment. Although Dream Theater has since invited him to play reunion shows, Moore has said he prefers to move forward as opposed to looking back. He notably declined to take part in the official Dream Theater biography titled Lifting Shadows, despite involvement from every other former member of Dream Theater and various former associates of the group.

During his time in Dream Theater, Moore wrote the lyrics to songs on each of the band's albums and also to some of the band's demos and b-sides. On When Dream and Day Unite, he wrote "Light Fuse and Get Away", "Only a Matter of Time", and parts of The Killing Hand". On Images and Words, he penned "Pull Me Under", "Surrounded", "Wait for Sleep", and parts of "Metropolis—Part I: 'The Miracle and the Sleeper' ". On Awake, the songs "6:00", "Lie", and "Space-Dye Vest" all featured his lyrics. Demos with his lyrics include "Don't Look Past Me, "A Vision" and "Two Far".

=== Chroma Key ===
After leaving Dream Theater, Moore moved to Santa Fe, New Mexico, and started writing material for his solo album. A demo tape known as Music Meant to Be Heard was shared among fans, and the songs included many spoken-word samples from interviews Moore recorded during his cross-country travels. Most of these songs were later released in 1999 on a limited-edition CD called This is a Recording.

In 1998, Moore released his first solo album, Dead Air For Radios, under the name Chroma Key on his self-created record label, Fight Evil Records. Mark Zonder and Joey Vera of Fates Warning served as his support musicians for that record. The album featured a dark, ambient sound, closer to Peter Gabriel and Tori Amos than the complex and intricate Dream Theater style. In hindsight, Dream Theater fans noticed that Moore had subtly explored this style of composition in "Space-Dye Vest".

In 2000, Moore moved to Los Angeles, where he recorded the digitally-themed You Go Now. The line-up for that record was Moore, David Iscove (guitars) and Steve Tushar (loops, programming). During his westcoast stay, Moore earned a BFA at California Institute of the Arts, where he created a little-known documentary called Octember Revolution, which depicted a Southern California gated community intervention. He then moved to Costa Rica, where he worked for Radio For Peace International, producing a bi-weekly activist radio program. In fact, some of Moore's work on Radio for Peace International was later released in an internet-only album called Memory Hole 1.

In 2004, Moore scoured public domain films looking for one that exuded a certain mood, intending to write a pseudo-soundtrack to it. The film he chose was Age 13, an educational film from the 1950s, originally for use in schools. He took the existing film, slowed it to half speed, and let it dictate the moods, textures, and even running times of the songs he wrote to it. The resulting album is titled Graveyard Mountain Home, which included a DVD containing the movie set to Moore's music.

=== OSI ===
In 2003, Fates Warning guitarist Jim Matheos invited Moore to work with him on a new musical project. Moore had worked with Matheos before, appearing as guest keyboardist on Fates Warning's 1989 album Perfect Symmetry, 1997 album A Pleasant Shade of Gray and 2000 album Disconnected. The new project involved Dream Theater drummer Mike Portnoy and Cynic bassist/Chapman Stick player Sean Malone. This would be the first time Moore had worked with Portnoy since leaving Dream Theater nearly 10 years earlier. The band that was formed was named OSI, and they released the album Office of Strategic Influence. Musically, it can be described as a mixture of Chroma Key's dark, melodic focus with the guitars and heaviness of Fates Warning and Dream Theater. Moore assumed vocal duties.

In April 2006, Moore and Matheos released a second OSI album called Free, a collaboration made easier by Moore's temporary relocation to Montreal, Canada. The album once again featured Portnoy on drums. Unlike the first OSI album, which was based on an information-spinning faction of the U.S. government, Free was about the personal relationships in Moore's life. Shortly following the album's release, OSI also released an EP that included remixes of three Free songs and a video of the title track. In the spring of 2006, Moore and Matheos alluded to possible tourdates in the support of the album, but nothing ever materialized.

In September 2008, Moore announced on his website that he had been working for several months with Jim Matheos and drummer Gavin Harrison (of the band Porcupine Tree) on the third OSI album. Blood was released in April 2009.

OSI's fourth album, Fire Make Thunder, was released in March 2012.

=== Film soundtracks ===
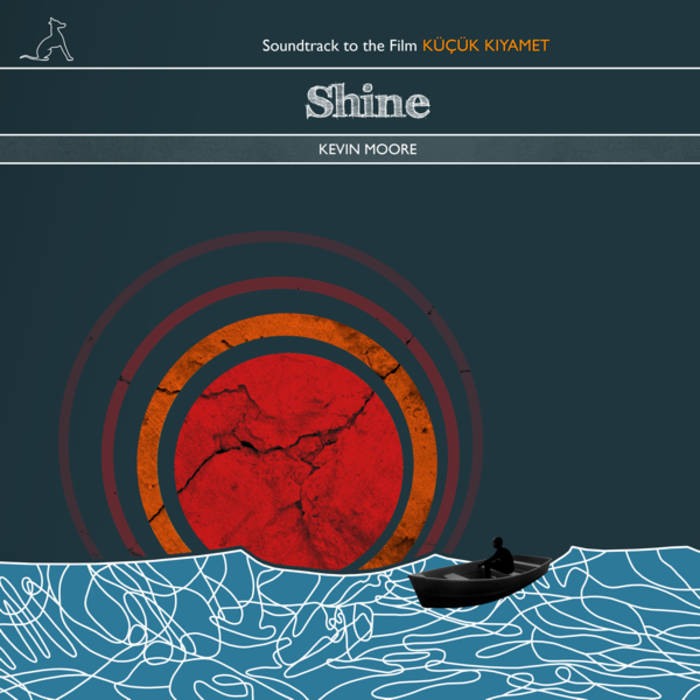
Kevin Moore - Shine album cover

In 2004, Moore relocated to Istanbul, Turkey, and composed the soundtrack to the horror film Okul (The School) which was subsequently released as a solo record titled Ghost Book. The music contained many traditional instruments stemming from Moore's stays in Costa Rica and Turkey. In 2006, Moore once again teamed up with Turkish producers for another soundtrack project. The film, Küçük Kıyamet (The Little Apocalypse), tells the horrific tale of a family who decides to rent a summer house by the seaside. Its soundtrack CD Shine was self-released December 2010 after a funding campaign on Kickstarter Both films, Okul and Küçük Kıyamet, were based on books written by Turkish author Doğu Yücel.

=== Other ===
While in Turkey, he also produced a radio show along with Theron Patterson and Pınar Türen for Açık Radyo in Istanbul.

In March 2007, Moore played an hour-long concert, which was held at Turkey's Balo Stage on March 23. It was described as a try-out to "play some songs for a local crowd...with longer, more elaborate shows planned for the future." In April 2007, Moore announced plans to pre-produce the debut album of Turkish industrial rock band Makine which was released in April 2010.

Since 2015, Moore has had a Patreon page for Chroma Key, collecting crowdfunding for song releases.

In a 2019 interview, Dream Theater vocalist James LaBrie stated that he recently got in touch with Moore via texting, and stated that the former band mates are still friends.

== Influence ==
In an April 2007 interview, Sonata Arctica keyboardist Henrik Klingenberg revealed that he was really influenced by Moore when he (Klingenberg) began playing rock music. Television and film composer Roy Harter and producer/composer Michael J. Bazini (a.k.a. DJ Butterface) were among Moore's private students during his early career with Dream Theater.

== Personal life ==
In September 2013, Fates Warning vocalist Ray Alder revealed in an interview that Moore returned to the United States and studied to become a doctor. According to Alder, Moore was in his third year of medical school as of 2013.

Since 2020, Moore has been working as a psychiatrist at Trinity Health in Minot, North Dakota. He earned his Doctor of Osteopathic Medicine from Des Moines University in Iowa and completed his psychiatry residency at Garnet Health Medical Center in Middletown, New York.

== Discography ==
With Dream Theater

- The Majesty Demos (1986)
- When Dream and Day Unite (1989)
- Images and Words (1992)
- Live at the Marquee (1993)
- Images and Words: Live in Tokyo (1993)
- Awake (1994)
- Greatest Hit (2008)

With OSI

- Office of Strategic Influence (2003)
- Free (2006)
- re:free (EP) (2006)
- Blood (2009)
- Fire Make Thunder (2012)

With Fates Warning

- Perfect Symmetry (1989)
- A Pleasant Shade of Gray (1997)
- Disconnected (2000)

As Chroma Key

- Dead Air for Radios (1998)
- Colorblind – single (1999)
- You Go Now (2000)
- Graveyard Mountain Home (2004)
- Patreon Demos (2015-2017)

As Kevin Moore

- Music Meant to Be Heard (1995)
- This is a Recording (1999)
- Memory Hole 1 (2004)
- Ghost Book (Inside Out Music, 2004)
- Shine (2010)

Involvement on other albums

Year	Album	Artist	Credit(s)
1998	"The Blackest Album: An Industrial Tribute to Metallica"	Various Artists	Keyboards on Carbon 12's version of "The Thing That Should Not Be"
2002	Make Believe	On	Keyboards on "When the World Is Running Down" (Cover by The Police)
2007	Makine	Makine	Pre-production
2008	Oscillate	Steve Tushar	Vocals on "Periscope"
2012	North Atlantic Echoes	In Progress	Additional programming, textures, and background vocals on "Chasing Ghosts", "Cloudburst", and "Graveyard Snowfall"
2012	Three Wise Monkeys	Alberto Rigoni	Keyboards on "Mizaru"
2013	Upcoming untitled release	Chaos Venture	Keyboards, Vocals
2013	Darkness in a Different Light	Fates Warning	Lyrics for "O Chloroform"
2014	The Book of Gates	Amadeus Awad's EON	Keyboards
2019	Descender	Avandra	Keyboards on "Derelict Minds"
2019	Complet_	Desperate Machines	Lyrics and Vocals
