= Images and Words =

1992 studio album by Dream Theater

Studio album by Dream Theater
- Released: July 7, 1992
- Recorded: October–December 1991
- Studio: BearTracks Studios, Suffern, New York; The Hit Factory, New York City
- Genre: Progressive metal
- Length: 57:04
- Label: ATCO
- Producer: David Prater

Dream Theater chronology
| When Dream and Day Unite (1989) | Images and Words (1992) | Live at the Marquee (1993) |

Singles from Images and Words
- 1. "Pull Me Under" Released: August 1992; 2. "Another Day" Released: July 1993

Images and Words is the second studio album by American progressive metal band Dream Theater, released on July 7, 1992, through Atco Records. It is the first Dream Theater release to feature James LaBrie on vocals. Since its release, the album has maintained its position as the band's most commercially successful studio album, and the song "Pull Me Under" has the distinction of being the only Top 10 hit (radio or otherwise) the band has had to date. This particular song also had renewed popularity due to its appearance in the 2008 video game Guitar Hero World Tour.

== History ==
After Charlie Dominici's departure from Dream Theater, the band auditioned nearly 200 people across the nation, until James LaBrie, who at that point was part of Canadian glam metal band Winter Rose, sent the band an audition tape. After a short jam session, he was named Dream Theater's new lead singer, and has remained with them ever since.

With LaBrie as the new vocalist, the band was signed to a seven-album contract by Atco Records, and shortly thereafter, they began recording their new album in late 1991. The album's production was marred with tensions, as the band clashed with producer David Prater, including incidents where Prater would lock the band out of the studio while forcing drummer Mike Portnoy to use triggered snare and bass drum samples, with the snare sample being the exact one used on FireHouse's 1992 album Hold Your Fire, another album Prater produced around the same time.

The lead single, "Pull Me Under", gained the band considerable commercial success with its airplay on MTV and radio, garnering them a top 10 hit on Billboard's Hot Mainstream Rock Tracks chart. When the album was released, it sold at a steady pace, helped by an extensive world tour.

Dream Theater originally intended to release a double album, but that plan was rejected by ATCO, causing several songs to be omitted from the album. One of these songs, "A Change of Seasons", would later be re-recorded by the band and released on an EP of the same name in 1995.

The song "Take the Time" includes samples from Kurtis Blow's "Christmas Rappin'" ("Hold it now"), Frank Zappa's "Dancin' Fool" ("Wait a minute"), and Public Enemy's "Power to the People", ("Come on"). The song also features a quote from Giuseppe Tornatore's movie Cinema Paradiso: "Ora che ho perso la vista, ci vedo di più" ("Now that I have lost my sight, I see more"), sung and paraphrased by LaBrie shortly before in the song ("I can see much clearer now, I'm blind"). LaBrie had appeared as a guest vocalist on Fates Warning's 1991 album Parallels, for which the band was credited as "Dream Theatre" in the "special thanks" of the album's credits. Dream Theater responded by thanking "Fatez Warning" in the credits of Images and Words.

Images and Words was played in its entirety on several occasions during the European leg of the 2007 "Chaos in Motion" tour, in celebration of its 15th anniversary. On July 7, 2012, at a concert in Austin, Texas, the songs "Pull Me Under", "Another Day", and "Metropolis" were performed as an encore to celebrate the album's 20th anniversary; additionally, "Surrounded" was performed during the main set. In 2017, Dream Theater celebrated the 25th anniversary of the album on the "Images, Words & Beyond" tour in Europe, which started on January 30 at the Auditorium Parco Della Musica in Rome, Italy.

In a 2019 interview with Greg Prato in SongFacts, LaBrie listed Images and Words as the Dream Theater album he is most proud of, because "that established what Dream Theater really is. I think it's a phenomenal album from beginning to end."

The album was reissued in 2013 on vinyl as a limited edition 180 gram double LP.

== Tour ==
Dream Theater kicked off a world-wide tour in support of the album, starting on September 27, 1992, in New York City, United States, continued with relentless touring throughout North America and Japan, consisted of 97 dates across the US and Canada, one show in Mexico, and 3 dates in Japan.

A tour of Europe followed in 1993, which included a show at London's famed Marquee Club. The show was recorded and released as Live at the Marquee, Dream Theater's first official live album. Additionally, a video compilation of their Japanese concerts (mixed in with documentary-style footage of the off-stage portion of the tour) was released as Images and Words: Live in Tokyo.

== Reception ==
Professional ratings
Review scores
| Source | Rating |
|---|---|
| AllMusic | 4.5/5 stars |
| Collector's Guide to Heavy Metal | 8/10 |
| Metal Storm | 9.6/10 |
| Rock Hard | 10/10 |
| Select | 2/5 |

The album has received acclaim from music critics since its release. The German magazine Rock Hard elected Images and Words Album of the Month and lauded Dream Theater, using "the old [1970s] term 'supergroup'"; according to the reviewer, they set "standards and still perfect them, although they hardly appear to do so" and, even considering the many influences in their music, the "versatility, the linking of different grooves and melody elements within each songs" shows how Dream Theater are "style-transcending like no other band." In another contemporary review, Select gave the album a lower rating, referring to the album as "elaborate, layered prog-metal" and stated that "if this was a book, it'd be for the coffee-table, glossy but not essential." Phil Carter of AllMusic was taken by the band members' "impressive ability on their respective instruments" and by LaBrie's vocal range, writing also that the album is an "excellent mix of progressive metal stylings with heartfelt vocals and thought-provoking lyrics". Metal Storm reviewer calls Images and Words "a masterpiece and also a historical album", because it "brought something totally new to the scene, this famous progressive metal sound that would become Dream Theater's signature". Canadian journalist Martin Popoff in his Collector's Guide to Heavy Metal praised the band's musicianship and "the tricky arrangements", but was not thrilled by the album, which he found "a bit too self-aware and calculated to be in the true spirit of progressive rock."

Images and Words was a moderate commercial hit, reaching number 61 on the US Billboard 200 chart. It is also Dream Theater's only album to be certified gold by the RIAA, and remains their best-selling album to date, selling more than 600,000 copies.

=== Accolades ===
On April 9, 2013, Images and Words won Loudwire's fan-voted March Metal Madness award for best metal album of all time. In 2025, it was ranked by the same magazine as the 4th best progressive metal album of the 1990s.

The song "Under a Glass Moon" was awarded the 98th best guitar solo by an About.com guitar expert.

In October 2011, Images and Words was ranked number 7 on Guitar World magazine's top ten list of guitar albums of 1992.

In 2015, the album was ranked first on the website Prog Report's list of the top 50 progressive rock albums of 1990–2015. Four other Dream Theater albums made the list: Metropolis Pt. 2: Scenes from a Memory (third), Six Degrees of Inner Turbulence (14th), Awake (18th), and Train of Thought (38th).

In 2017, it was ranked 95th at Rolling Stone's "100 Greatest Metal Albums of All Time".

== Track listing ==
All music is composed by Dream Theater, except "Wait for Sleep" by Kevin Moore.

| No. | Title | Lyrics | Length |
|---|---|---|---|
| 1. | "Pull Me Under" | Moore | 8:14 |
| 2. | "Another Day" | John Petrucci | 4:23 |
| 3. | "Take the Time" | Dream Theater | 8:21 |
| 4. | "Surrounded" | Moore | 5:30 |
| 5. | "Metropolis—Part I: 'The Miracle and the Sleeper' " | Petrucci | 9:32 |
| 6. | "Under a Glass Moon" | Petrucci | 7:03 |
| 7. | "Wait for Sleep" | Moore | 2:31 |
| 8. | "Learning to Live" | John Myung | 11:30 |
| Total length: | | | 57:04 |

== Personnel ==
Dream Theater

- James LaBrie – lead and backing vocals
- Kevin Moore – keyboards
- John Myung – bass
- John Petrucci – guitars
- Mike Portnoy – drums, percussion

Additional musicians

- Jay Beckenstein – soprano saxophone on "Another Day"

Production

- David Prater – producer, mixing
- Doug Oberkircher – engineer, mixing
- Steve Regina – assistant engineer
- Ted Jensen – mastering at Sterling Sound, New York
- Larry Freemantle – art direction

== Charts ==
| Chart (1992–93) | Peak position |
|---|---|
| German Albums (Offizielle Top 100) | 94 |
| Japanese Albums (Oricon) | 30 |
| US Billboard 200 | 61 |
| US Heatseekers Albums (Billboard) | 2 |

| Chart (2005) | Peak position |
|---|---|
| Italian Albums (FIMI) | 88 |

| Chart (2009) | Peak position |
|---|---|
| Japanese Albums (Oricon) | 232 |

| Chart (2025) | Peak position |
|---|---|
| Greek Albums (IFPI) | 98 |

== Certifications ==
| Region | Certification | Certified units/sales |
|---|---|---|
| Japan (RIAJ) | Gold | 100,000^{^} |
| United States (RIAA) | Gold | 500,000^{^} |
^{^} Shipments figures based on certification alone.
