= Dead Air for Radios =

Studio album by Chroma Key
- Released: December 16, 1998
- Recorded: Bill's Place, North Hollywood, CA
- Genre: Electronica
- Length: 44:04
- Label: Fight Evil Records
- Producers: Kevin Moore, Steve Tushar

Chroma Key chronology
Music Meant to Be Heard (1995)	Dead Air for Radios (1998)	You Go Now (2000)

Professional ratings
Review scores
Source	Rating
Allmusic	2.5/5 stars
Scream Magazine	4/6
Sputnikmusic	5/5

Dead Air for Radios is a studio album by Kevin Moore, under the musical moniker Chroma Key. It was released through Fight Evil Records on December 16, 1998. The album was recorded by Steve Tushar at Bill's Place Rehearsal Studio in Hollywood, mixed by both Steve Tushar and Kevin Moore with final mastering by Eddy Schreyer. Since its release the album has sold around 10,000 copies.

== Themes ==
The voice of a woman repeating words and numbers in German during "Even the Waves" is from a famous numbers station broadcast on shortwave frequencies. "S.O.S." was one of the first songs Moore wrote for the album. The spoken sample is of a German man Moore met in Santa Fe who described his experiences of hitch-hiking from LA to Santa Fe.

== Track listing ==
All tracks are written by Kevin Moore (Lyrics Mouse written by Todd Farrington).

No.	Title	Length
1.	"Colorblind"	4:52
2.	"Even the Waves"	6:33
3.	"Undertow"	4:49
4.	"America the Video"	4:32
5.	"S.O.S."	5:25
6.	"Camera 4"	3:49
7.	"On the Page"	4:21
8.	"Mouse (Now Watch What Happens)"	5:41
9.	"Hell Mary"	4:04
10.	"On the Page (Different Vocal Version) (Japanese Edition)"	4:21
11.	"Chroma Key (demo) (Japanese Edition)"	5:22

== Personnel ==
=== Musicians ===
- Kevin Moore – vocals, keyboards, bass
- Mark Zonder – drums
- Jason Anderson – guitars
- Joey Vera – bass on tracks 3, 4, and 5

=== Production ===
- Kevin Moore – artwork, producer, mixing
- Steve Tushar – engineering
- Eddy Schreyer – mastering
- Steve Tushar – producer, mixing
- Esther Mera – artwork
