= Shine (Kevin Moore album) =

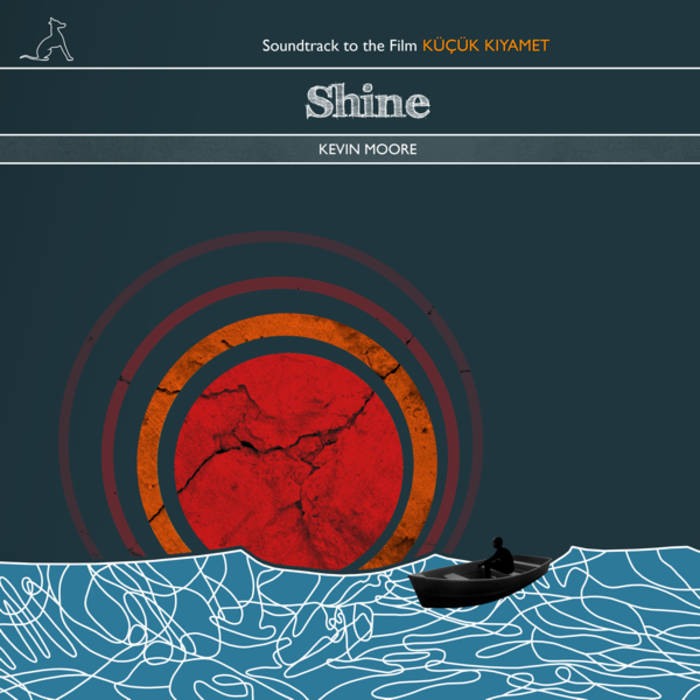

Soundtrack album by Kevin Moore
- Released: December 10, 2010
- Genre: Soundtrack
- Length: 41:10
- Label: Self-released
- Producer: Kevin Moore

Kevin Moore chronology
Ghost Book (2004)	Shine (2010)

Shine is the soundtrack to the 2006 Turkish film Küçük kiyamet (“Little Apocalypse“). Kevin Moore wrote the music while he was living in Istanbul, Turkey. The album was funded by fans and released via Kickstarter.com on CD in 2011.

== Track listing ==
No.	Title	Length
1.	"Shine (Intro)"	2:37
2.	"Window Theme"	1:51
3.	"Departures"	3:31
4.	"Uyku"	2:01
5.	"Arrivals"	0:46
6.	"Graveyard View"	1:42
7.	"Hypnogogic"	0:51
8.	"Mosquito Dream"	1:01
9.	"Korkma"	1:55
10.	"Zeki Cycle"	1:37
11.	"Hypnopompic"	1:07
12.	"Bulutlar"	1:27
13.	"Mezar Isimleri"	1:15
14.	"Lights Out"	7:21
15.	"Sh"	2:42
16.	"Çıkmak"	3:59
17.	"Shine"	5:27

=== Credits ===
- Written and performed by Kevin Moore
- Vocals by Bige Akdeniz
- Cover artwork by Conte di San Pietro
