= Time Will Tell Our Story =

Studio album by The Gordons
- Released: 2002
- Recorded: 2001
- Genre: Folk
- Length: 53:28
- Label: Blueberry Hill Records
- Producer: Gary Gordon, Roberta Gordon

The Gordons chronology
Live in Holland (1999)	Time Will Tell Our Story (2002)	Our Time (2008)

Professional ratings
Review scores
Source	Rating
AllMusic	3/5 stars

Time Will Tell Our Story was released by folk music duo The Gordons in 2002. It was produced by Gary Gordon and Roberta Gordon. It was engineered by Mark Stoffel at Roan Pony Studio in Murphysboro, Illinois; Tim Carter at TreeHouse Studio in Ridgetop, Tennessee; and Mark Howard at Signal Path in Nashville, Tennessee. It was also mixed by Mark Howard. It was mastered by David Shipley at Foxwood Mastering and Editing in Nashville, Tennessee.

== Track listing ==
1. "Make Believe" (G. Gordon) - 3:34
2. "Gone Gonna Rise Again" (Si Kahn) - 4:49
3. "The Flood" (G. Gordon) - 3:18
4. "Worth It To Watch 'Em Run" (Noah Gordon) - 2:05
5. "Cottonmill" (Holly Tashian, R. Gordon) - 4:00
6. "Ashland Breakdown" (Bill Monroe) - 3:25
7. "Sweet Time" (R. Gordon) - 3:24
8. "Better Place" (R. Gordon, G. Gordon) - 3:51
9. "Follow Mother Home" (R. Gordon, G. Gordon) - 4:15
10. "Goin' Home" (R. Gordon, G. Gordon) - 2:57
11. "John Barleycorn" (Traditional; arr. and adapt. by G. Gordon) - 8:02
12. "She Loves Her Children So" (R. Gordon, G. Gordon) - 2:16
13. "Time Will Tell Our Story" (G. Gordon, R. Gordon) - 4:17
14. "I Believe" (R. Gordon, G. Gordon) - 3:15

== Personnel ==
=== The Gordons ===
- Gary Gordon – vocals, guitar
- Roberta Gordon – vocals, autoharp

=== Additional personnel ===
- Robert Bowlin – fiddle
- Bill Cross - banjo
- Holly Tashian - harmony
- Alison Brown - banjo
- Curtis Jay - bass
- Mark Stoffel - mandolin
- Noah Gordon - vocals
- Ross Sermons - bass
- Wil Maring - bass
- Katsuyaki Miyazaki - mandolin
