= Memory Hole 1 =

Album by Kevin Moore

Studio album by Kevin Moore
- Released: April 2004
- Recorded: 2004
- Genre: Radio show, electronic music, ambient, muzak
- Length: 79:38
- Producer: Kevin Moore

Kevin Moore chronology
This is a Recording (1999)	Memory Hole 1 (2004)	Ghost Book (2004)

Memory Hole 1 consists of an 80-minute radio program that Kevin Moore did for Radio for Peace International, combined with ambient, electronic and muzak music in the background. The album was made along with other collaborators: some monologues were recorded by Bob Nekrasov in Ciudad Colon. Daniel Beierstettel, and Theron Patterson contributed with music to some tracks. Radio samples were contributed by Radio for Peace International station owner James Latham. Music from Múm, Fela Kuti and The Who were sampled in some tracks.

== Track listing ==
I. Enduring Freedom Part 1
No.	Title	Length
0.	"Intro"	0:08
1.	"It Goes Something Like This"	7:55
2.	"Homily"	3:13
3.	"The Little Parts We Like"	4:23
4.	"When Fear Ends"	3:04
5.	"I'd Like to Beat You Up"	2:47
6.	"Verily"	2:39
7.	"Saying This Is a Time of War"	4:07
8.	"Christmas Message"	1:19

II. Enduring Freedom Part 2
No.	Title	Length
9.	"So You Become"	1:07
10.	"Mother of Exiles"	6:40
11.	"Black Horse Carousel"	1:27
12.	"Preacherman Show"	4:56
13.	"Why Is It"	6:56

III. Meet The New Boss
No.	Title	Length
14.	"Our Folks"	2:53
15.	"State of the Union"	6:58
16.	"What the Bastards Say"	6:07
17.	"The Mark of the Wizard"	3:36
18.	"The Christ Android"	3:12
19.	"Think Back"	6:11
Total length:		79:38
