= Live at the Marquee (Dream Theater album) =

1993 live album by Dream Theater

Live album by Dream Theater
- Released: August 31, 1993
- Recorded: April 23, 1993
- Venue: Marquee Club (London)
- Genre: Progressive metal; progressive rock
- Length: 46:57
- Label: ATCO
- Producer: Dream Theater

Dream Theater chronology
Images and Words (1992)	Live at the Marquee (1993)	Awake (1994)

Professional ratings
Review scores
Source	Rating
AllMusic	3/5 stars
Collector's Guide to Heavy Metal	6/10

Live at the Marquee is the first live album by American progressive metal band Dream Theater, recorded at London's Marquee Club on April 23, 1993. The cover image is inspired by the Sacred Heart of Jesus. It features the exclusive release of "Bombay Vindaloo", an improvisation-based composition performed live only six times and never recorded in a studio. "The Killing Hand" is preceded by an instrumental titled "Another Hand", written on tour specifically to bridge from the ending of "Another Day" (which always preceded it in the setlist). Most of James LaBrie's vocals were actually re-recorded in a studio.

== Track listing ==
All music by Dream Theater.

European release
No.	Title	Lyrics	Length
1.	"Metropolis—Part I: "The Miracle and the Sleeper""	John Petrucci	9:36
2.	"A Fortune in Lies"	Petrucci	5:10
3.	"Bombay Vindaloo"	(instrumental)	6:48
4.	"Surrounded"	Kevin Moore	6:00
5.	"Another Hand" / "The Killing Hand"	Petrucci	10:30
6.	"Pull Me Under"	Moore	8:42

Alternate track on the Japanese release (replacing "Surrounded")
No.	Title	Lyrics	Length
4.	"Another Day"	Petrucci	4:37

=== Actual set list ===
(from Portnoy's concert database):

- Metropolis Part I
- A Fortune in Lies
- Under a Glass Moon (only released on CD that came with the first edition of Lifting Shadows biography)
- Surrounded
- Ytse Jam (w/ Drum Solo) (not released)
- Bombay Vindaloo
- Another Day (only released in Japan, replacing "Surrounded")
- Another Hand
- The Killing Hand
- Pull Me Under
- Take the Time (not released)

Encore

- Wait for Sleep (not released)
- Learning to Live (not released)
- Twin Peaks (Outro Tape)

== Personnel ==
=== Dream Theater ===
- James LaBrie – lead vocals
- Kevin Moore – keyboards
- John Myung – bass
- John Petrucci – guitars
- Mike Portnoy – drums

=== Production ===
- Tim Summerhayes – recording engineer
- Vinnie Kowalski – live sound engineer
- Doug Oberkircher – mixing at BearTracks Studios in Suffern, New York, and Quad Sound Studios in New York City
- Ted Jensen – mastering at Sterling Sound in New York City

== Charts ==
Chart (1993)	Peak position
Dutch Albums (Album Top 100)	57
