= Pull Me Under =

Single by Dream Theater

from the album Images and Words
- B-side: Metropolis—Part I: "The Miracle and the Sleeper"
- Released: August 1992
- Recorded: October 1991 – December 1991 at BearTracks Studios in Suffern, New York
- Genre: Progressive metal
- Length: 8:11
- Label: Atco
- Composers: James LaBrie; Kevin Moore; John Myung; John Petrucci; Mike Portnoy
- Lyricist: Kevin Moore
- Producer: David Prater

Dream Theater singles chronology
| "Afterlife" (1989) | "Pull Me Under" (1992) | "Another Day" (1993) |

Music video
- Official video on YouTube

"Pull Me Under" is the debut single by Dream Theater from their 1992 album Images and Words. It is also featured on the Live at the Marquee CD, Once in a LIVEtime CD, Live at Budokan CD and DVD, the Images and Words: Live in Tokyo VHS and DVD, and the Live at Luna Park DVD. It received positive critical reception and extensive MTV rotation. Widely considered to be Dream Theater's signature song, Rolling Stone ranked it number No. 91 on their list of the 100 greatest heavy metal songs.

== Overview ==
During development, the song held the working title "Oliver's Twist". In a radio interview, Mike Portnoy stated that "...it was just an 8 and a half minute song, and it was just a fluke for MTV and radio play to happen."

The song's abrupt ending was modified in their Greatest Hit compilation. When asked about the abrupt ending while at a drum clinic in Atlanta in 1999, Mike Portnoy explained "We had all this tension, and it just kept building and building, and we had no idea where to take it, you know? So we decided to just pull the plug on it, like the Beatles did with 'She's So Heavy'."

The song was released as a promotional single and as a music video. Based on a shortened version of the song at 4:48 in length, the video alternates between clips of the band performing and an obscure storyline. The band members were reportedly unhappy with the storyline, saying that it doesn't have anything to do with the song's subject matter.

Because it was the only Dream Theater single to achieve such success, "Pull Me Under" is the "hit" referred to in the Dream Theater compilation Greatest Hit (...and 21 Other Pretty Cool Songs).

== Lyrics ==
Lyricist Kevin Moore refers to Shakespeare's Hamlet, as told from Prince Hamlet's point of view. The lyrics allude heavily to the play, echoing Hamlet's desire to give in to his urge to gain revenge for his father at the cost of his own sanity. Over the final moments of the song, James LaBrie can be heard singing the song's only direct quote from the play: "O, that this too, too solid flesh would melt". Therein, Prince Hamlet is pleading for escape from his mortal trappings.

O, that this too, too solid flesh would melt,
Thaw, and resolve itself into a dew!
Or that the Everlasting had not fix'd
His canon 'gainst self-slaughter! O God! God!
How weary, stale, flat, and unprofitable
Seem to me all the uses of this world!

— Prince Hamlet in Hamlet, Act I Scene II

== Track listing ==
All lyrics are written by Kevin Moore, except where noted; all music is composed by Dream Theater.

| No. | Title | Length |
|---|---|---|
| 1. | "Pull Me Under" | 8:11 |

UK promo vinyl
| No. | Title | Lyrics | Length |
|---|---|---|---|
| 2. | "Metropolis Part I - The Miracle and the Sleeper" | John Petrucci | 9:30 |

US promo CD (PRCD 4724-2)
| No. | Title | Length |
|---|---|---|
| 1. | "Pull Me Under" (Edit) | 5:54 |
| 2. | "Pull Me Under" (LP Version) | 8:11 |

US promo CD (PRCD 4928)
| No. | Title | Length |
|---|---|---|
| 1. | "Pull Me Under" (MTV Version) | 4:49 |
| 2. | "Pull Me Under" (Edit) | 6:01 |

== Personnel ==
- James LaBrie – lead and background vocals
- Kevin Moore – keyboards
- John Myung – bass
- John Petrucci – guitars
- Mike Portnoy – drums, percussion

=== Credits ===
- David Prater – production

== Charts ==
| Chart (1992) | Peak position |
|---|---|
| U.S. Billboard Mainstream Rock Tracks | 10 |

== Releases ==
- CD single, promo – Atco Records PRCD 4624-2, US 1992
- Vinyl, 12", 45 RPM single, promo – Rock Ahead SAM 1030, UK 1992
- CD single, promo – Atco Records PRCD 4724-2, US 1992
- CD single, promo – Atco Records PRCD 4928, US 1992
