= Vuelvo (song) =

Single by Beto Cuevas

from the album Miedo Escenico
- Released: 11 August 2008
- Recorded: 2008
- Genre: Pop rock, alternative rock
- Length: 4:13
- Label: Warner Bros.
- Songwriter: Beto Cuevas
- Producers: Beto Cuevas, Steve Tushar

Beto Cuevas singles chronology
"Vuelvo" (2008)	"Háblame" (2009)

"Vuelvo" is a pop rock and alternative rock song recorded by Beto Cuevas, Chilean singer and ex member of the internationally successful and Grammy-winning band La Ley and the first single from his first solo studio album, Miedo Escenico.

== Song information ==
The first single from him debut solo album was released as radio airplay in Chile on 11 August 2008 and later Mexico, finally was released in radio airplay, digital download and CD single in September 2008. The song was written during 2007 by himself in Los Angeles, California. It was co-produced with Steve Tushar and Aureo Baquerio.

== Music video ==
This music video for the single "Vuelvo" was filmed in Los Angeles, California, United States in August 2008, and was directed by Cuevas. The music videos shows Beto Cuevas walking through streets and playing his guitar and singing, while wearing colored shirts and being followed by a girl. The music video premiered in MTV Latin America on 12 September 2008 and peaked at number 2 in Los 10+ Pedidos Argentina, peaking at number 8 in Los 10+ Pedidos Chile. On 30 September 2008 the music videos were made available on the iTunes Store United States.

== Track listing ==
CD single

1. "Vuelvo" (Single Version) – 4:13
2. "Vuelvo" (Album Version) – 4:15
3. "Vuelvo" (Stop Psycodelic Remix) – 5:37

Digital Download Single 1

1. "Vuelvo" (Single Version) – 4:13

Digital Download Single 1

1. "Vuelvo" (Single Version) – 4:13
2. "Vuelvo" (Stop Psycodelic Remix) – 5:37

== Charts ==
Chart (2008)	Peak position
U.S. Billboard Hot Latin Tracks	47
U.S. Billboard Latin Pop Airplay	28

== Release history ==
Country	Date	Record label	Format
Chile	August 11, 2008	Warner Bros. Records	Radio airplay
Chile	August 26, 2008	Warner Bros. Records	Digital Download
Mexico	August 27, 2008	Warner Bros. Records	Radio airplay/Digital Download
United States	September 11, 2008	Warner Bros. Records	Radio airplay/Digital Download
United States	September 23, 2008	Warner Bros. Records	CD single
