= Fire Make Thunder =

Studio album by OSI
- Released: March 27, 2012
- Recorded: 2011
- Genres: Progressive rock, progressive metal
- Length: 43:13
- Label: Metal Blade
- Producers: Jim Matheos, Kevin Moore

OSI chronology
Blood (2009)	Fire Make Thunder (2012)

Fire Make Thunder is the fourth and final studio album by American progressive rock band OSI, released by Metal Blade Records on March 27, 2012 in Europe and North America.

As with the previous albums, both Jim Matheos and Kevin Moore wrote and recorded alone and sent song ideas back and forth for further elaboration. The album was written and recorded throughout most of 2011. Returning as the band's session drummer was Gavin Harrison, at the time formerly of Porcupine Tree, this time co-writing one of the tracks with the band. All other instruments and programming were performed by both Matheos and Moore, while vocals and lyrics were handled exclusively by Moore.

Critical reception for Fire Make Thunder was generally positive while the album sold 1,900 copies in the United States in its first week of release and peaked at position No. 18 on the Top New Artist Albums chart.

== Background ==
In May 2010 Metal Blade announced they had signed OSI and that guitarist Jim Matheos and keyboardist/vocalist Kevin Moore were currently working on the fourth album originally slated for a late 2010 release. It was not until January 2012 that the fourth album's track list, artwork and release date were revealed. Gavin Harrison of Porcupine Tree was reenlisted to take the role of session drummer with a co-writing credit for "Enemy Prayer", which was composed based on Harrison's drum contributions. Unlike previous albums the album marks the first not to feature any additional vocals beyond Moore. Matheos contributed this to the fact that there was ultimately enough material for an entire album and any additional vocals were unnecessary, but the decision to exclude additional vocalists was not necessarily intentional. Moore also stated that the album has a mood of consistency, better production and is more organic and unified than any previous release. Jimmy Ahlander directed a music video for the track "For Nothing".

== Music ==
In a similar fashion to previous records, the album was recorded in each musician's respective home studio with much development occurring within exchanges of material between Matheos and Moore. Matheos describes this practice as both a choice and a necessity that allows both musicians "to take our time to explore different ideas to really experiment on our own before we present ideas to each other."

Moore regarded Fire Make Thunder as "'real instrument' sounding, low-fi kind of [album]" with an emphasis on "organic" sounds. Matheos said the album was "little less of the heavy guitar-driven things", noting that it is "heavy" in the sense of themes, lyrics and mood rather than in the typical "heavy-metal" sense explaining, "I think it was a consistent dark mood throughout the whole thing. And that's not to say that it's extremely mellow all the way through. It does have heavy guitar parts throughout." Moore stated that he strived to form a sense of unity throughout the album based on this organic sound with a "lot of mellotron-ish and analog synth sounds and not so much digital pads or programming" as opposed to the "high-def brilliant sounds" of past efforts.

Moore defines his lyrical methodology as similar to the way he approaches creating music. "I start to come up with melodies as soon as I can. So I might record melodies without words, sort of mumble them. I keep myself at low volume", admitting the ridiculousness of the sound. Moreover, he states that once he records a general melody he will begin to play back the material to develop accents and phrasing to match the music. He explains "It's sort of a subliminal thing that you are telling yourself what the song is about somehow, from there I try to make sense of lyrics and make something that does make sense, I don't want to make something that is sort of a stream on conscious sort of thing that has a theme that people can connect to – I tried to make it so with every song, you know what it's about, not about a million things, just one thing." Matheos reiterates that rather than typical songwriting "starting with a riff or a chord progression, [most songs] start with a sound."

== Release and promotion ==
Fire Make Thunder was released by Metal Blade Records on March 27, 2012. Once again Moore and Matheos have deliberated and expressed interest in a live performance. Moore said it was something "always on our minds" and discussed the idea of performing a live studio version before embarking on any larger scale tours. With no plans yet solidified with the label it remains a possibility.

== Reception ==
Professional ratings
Review scores
Source	Rating
About.com	4/5 stars
Babyblaue Seiten	10/15
Blistering	7/10
Bloody Disgusting	(favorable)
Lords of Metal	81/100
Sputnikmusic	4/5

Critical reception for Fire Make Thunder was generally favorable. Todd Lyons of About.com gave the album 4 out of 5 stars and described the album as "evocative progressive metal, with the emphasis on the progressive" saying it "melts together from one track to the next to give it an artsy yet satisfying integrity". Ken McGrath of Blistering gave the album 7 out of 10, stating that it "may require a little work initially from the listener", but called it a "real charmer of an album" consisting of "sepia-toned memory spiral", "big, fuzzy guitar chorus [riffs]" and "shimmering notes as if water dripping down glass". Bloody Disgusting's Jonathan Barkan defined the album as "a sonic journey where new and amazing tones and sounds assault you from all sides constantly" noting "something very industrial … not referring to the electronic subgenre" but a vision of "steel factories … grimy smokestacks rising up, a dark smog cloud hanging overhead … it sounds fantastic".

Fire Make Thunder sold 1,900 copies in the United States in its first week of release. It peaked at No. 18 on Heatseekers Albums charts for the week of April 14, 2012 and on the Top Hard Music Albums Chart at No. 46. Internationally the album was featured on the Hard Music chart in Canada at No. 43 and No. 139 on the charts in Benelux.

== Track listing ==
All lyrics are written by Kevin Moore; all music is composed by Jim Matheos and Kevin Moore, except "Enemy Prayer" by Matheos, Moore and Gavin Harrison.

No.	Title	Length
1.	"Cold Call"	7:10
2.	"Guards"	5:03
3.	"Indian Curse"	4:42
4.	"Enemy Prayer"	4:54
5.	"Wind Won't Howl"	5:05
6.	"Big Chief II"	3:04
7.	"For Nothing"	3:18
8.	"Invisible Men"	9:54

== Personnel ==
- Jim Matheos – guitar, bass, keyboards, programming
- Kevin Moore – vocals, keyboards, programming
- Gavin Harrison – drums
- Produced by Jim Matheos and Kevin Moore
- Mixed by Matt Sepanic, Jim Matheos and Kevin Moore at the Sound Farm studio in Jamaica, Iowa
- Mastered by Roger Siebel
