= Ghost Book =

Ghost book

Soundtrack album by Kevin Moore
- Released: June 29, 2004
- Genre: Soundtrack
- Length: 45:10
- Label: InsideOut
- Producer: Kevin Moore

Kevin Moore chronology
Memory Hole 1 (2004)	Ghost book (2004)	Shine (2010)

Professional ratings
Review scores
Source	Rating
Allmusic	link

Ghost Book is the soundtrack to Turkish horror movie Okul. Kevin Moore made it while he was living in Istanbul, Turkey.

== Track listing ==
No.	Title	Length
1.	"Rhodes Song"	1:34
2.	"Prayer Call"	0:48
3.	"Piano Theme"	1:42
4.	"Roof Access (Day)"	3:33
5.	"Far Fara"	1:40
6.	"P.S."	1:30
7.	"Library Noise"	2:19
8.	"Overheard"	3:31
9.	"Romantik"	1:31
10.	"The Hecklers"	3:36
11.	"Mirrors and Phones"	4:02
12.	"Shall We Jump"	1:43
13.	"Cowbloke"	2:25
14.	"Erotik"	2:46
15.	"Roof Access (Night)"	3:20
16.	"Hallways and Light"	2:39
17.	"Afterschool"	0:54
18.	"Sad Sad Movie"	5:37
