= Miedo escénico =

Miedo Escenico

Studio album by Beto Cuevas
- Released: 23 September 2008
- Recorded: 2007–2008
- Genre: Pop rock, alternative rock
- Length: 45:05
- Label: Warner Bros.
- Producer: Beto Cuevas, Steve Tushar, Aureo Baqueiro

Beto Cuevas chronology
Miedo Escenico (2008)	Transformación (2012)

Singles from Miedo Escénico
- 1. "Vuelvo" Released: August 11, 2008; 2. "Háblame" Released: January 13, 2009; 3. "Un Minuto de Silencio" Released: December 2009; 4. "El Cínico" Released: February 2010

Miedo Escenico is the first solo studio album by the Chilean singer and ex-member of the Chilean rock band La Ley, Beto Cuevas. The album was released in Latin America on 23 September 2008, and in the United States on 30 September 2008 by Warner Brothers.

== History ==
This is Beto Cuevas' first solo album, post-La Ley. La Ley was a successful, Grammy-winning Chilean/Latin American band that Cuevas fronted from 1988 until 2005. To promote the album, Cuevas, along with his band consisting of musicians Ben Edwards, Lawrence Kats (Mighty Mighty Bosstones), Steve Tushar (Fear Factory) and Brendan Buckley (Shakira), initially toured several venues throughout the United States, followed by a small promotional tour in Argentina and Chile. The song "Vuelvo" was the first single to be launched from the record.

The album was produced by Steve Tushar and Aureo Baqueiro and Beto Cuevas. Beto was also involved in several other aspects of the production, including song-writing, designing of the album artwork and directing the music video for the song Vuelvo.

== Track listing ==
Standard Edition

1. "Miedo Escenico"
2. "Vuelvo"
3. "Un Minuto De Silencio"
4. "Háblame"
5. "Are You Sorry?"
6. "El Cínico"
7. "No Me Queda Nada"
8. "Algo"
9. "Tú y Yo"
10. "La Historia Que Nunca Vamos a Contar"
11. "Mi Única Verdad"
12. "Mañana"

== Release history ==
Country	Date
Chile	23 September 2008
Mexico	23 September 2008
United States	30 September 2008

== Charts ==
Chart (2008)	Country	Peak position	Provider	Sales	Certification
Chilean Albums Chart	Chile	8	IFPI		
Mexican Albums Chart	Mexico	11	AMPROFON	30,000	
Top Latin Albums	United States	33	Billboard		
Top Latin Pop Albums	United States	10	Billboard		
Top Heatseekers	United States	41	Billboard		
Top Heatseekers (Pacific)	United States	4	Billboard		
