= Office of Strategic Influence =

United States federal department for targeted psychological operations

The Office of Strategic Influence, or OSI, was a department created by the United States Department of Defense on October 30, 2001, to support the war on terrorism through psychological operations in targeted countries, which did not include the United States, because the Pentagon was barred from PSYOPs in the United States prior to the passing of the Smith-Mundt Modernization Act of 2012. However, BBC noted that "there is nothing to stop an American newspaper picking up a story carried abroad" in cases of news stories that were "black propaganda" with deliberately "misleading" information planted by the Pentagon under OSI.

Although the closure of the office was announced by Secretary of Defense Donald Rumsfeld soon after its existence became publicly known, later comments by Secretary Rumsfeld imply that the actual operations of the OSI have continued unabated. Some sources say OSI was authorized to use "military deception" against the public by "presenting false information, images, or statements", while other sources say "This type of action was not in OSI's charter, and [this] charge was never substantiated."

The OSI would have been a center for the creation of propaganda materials, but according to the leaked source, there were no plans to mislead enemy forces or foreign civilian populations. After information on the office spread through US and foreign media in mid February 2002, intense discussions on purpose and scope of the office were reported. Some argue that its secretive nature and stated purposes would make the existence of such an agency hard to determine. The office was closed by Rumsfeld because of the controversy. Some of its foreign responsibilities were moved to the Office of Information Activities.

In March 2022, the US Department of Defense established the Influence and Perception Management Office (IPMO) with the purpose of countering misinformation and spreading pro-US propaganda. Another office called the Defense Military Deception Program Office which according to a US budget document is tasked with "sensitive messaging, deception, influence, and other operations in the information environment" was established in the same year.

== Timeline ==
- February 19, 2002: Major US news organizations report that the Department of Defense had set up the Office of Strategic Influence. These reports quote an unnamed official, who is discussing the advantages of and dangers in setting up such an office.
- February 20, 2002: After discussions on the purpose of the Office in the US media, Douglas Feith, Under Secretary of Defense for Policy, assures the public in an interview that Defense Department officials will not undermine the credibility of US institutions by lying to the public, and states that the exact mandate of the office is under review.
- February 26, 2002: Rumsfeld announces the decision by Douglas Feith to close the Office of Strategic Influence.
- November 18, 2002: Rumsfeld states in a press briefing that the Office of Strategic Influence was closed down only in name, that the activities of the office still continue. Rumsfeld:

And then there was the office of strategic influence. You may recall that. And 'oh my goodness gracious isn't that terrible, Henny Penny the sky is going to fall.' I went down that next day and said fine, if you want to savage this thing fine I'll give you the corpse. There's the name. You can have the name, but I'm gonna keep doing every single thing that needs to be done and I have.

- November–December 2005. It is disclosed that the US Army secretly paid some Iraqi journalists to publish upbeat stories about the US military operations. This is interpreted by some authors as Rumsfeld having kept his word. The Pentagon again announces that it would stop such practices.

== See also ==
- Office of Public Diplomacy
- Office of Special Plans
- Perception management
- Black ops
- Psychological Operations, and the presence of Ft Bragg's 4th Psyops Gp at CNN and NPR
