= The Gordons (duo) =

Folk music duo

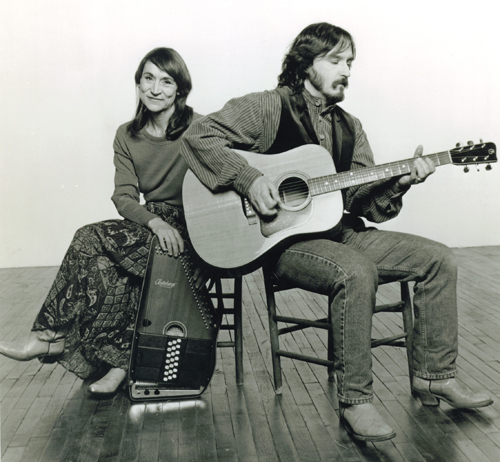
- The Gordons' promotional photo.

Background information
- Origin: Illinois, United States
- Genres: Bluegrass, Folk
- Years active: 1973–present
- Members: Gary Gordon; Roberta Gordon
- Website: www.thegordonsmusic.com

The Gordons are an American folk music duo consisting of Gary Gordon and Roberta Gordon, who are husband and wife. They have been performing professionally since 1973.

== Career ==
The Gordons have been bringing their folk, bluegrass, and country music blend to audiences since the 1970s, when they began touring throughout the Midwestern United States, playing clubs, fairs, festivals and colleges. The husband and wife duo has also become popular in the Carolinas, the Northeastern United States, and in Europe.

In 1989 they recorded with Dobroist Josh Graves and bluegrass fiddler Kenny Baker, from Bill Monroe's band, The Bluegrass Boys. The resulting album was Old Time Radio Show. The Gordons released Wasn't Born To Follow one year later; this was a more country flavored record, featuring fiddler Wade Ray.

In 1996, The Gordons toured Ireland, and performed live in Dublin on Ireland's RTÉ television network. End of a Long Hard Day was released in 1997; this album was hailed by critic Edward Morris of Billboard, who stated "the Gordons bring to mind that most listenable of all bluegrass bands, the great Flatt & Scruggs." The national folk music magazine, Dirty Linen, wrote that the album "is touching, sad and beautiful".

A live record chronicling their tours in Europe arrived in 1999, titled "Live in Holland". The Gordons released Time Will Tell Our Story in 2002, with guest musicians Alison Brown and Robert Bowlin. Our Time followed in 2008 on their own label. In 2008, Our Time was played so often on folk and bluegrass radio shows that it ranked as the No. 10 record of the year on folk radio.

Occasionally, they tour with a larger ensemble, including David Johnson, the longtime fiddler for Randy Travis.

== Discography ==
- 1976 Southern Illinois Bluegrass (Crusade LP896)
- 1977 Covered Bridge (Crusade LP798)
- 1989 Old Time Radio Show
- 1990 Wasn't Born to Follow (Alligator Music)
- 1992 Best of The Gordons (Street Level Records)
- 1995 Family Bible (Alligator Music)
- 1997 End Of A Long Hard Day (Reception Records)
- 1999 Live In Holland (Strictly Country Records)
- 2002 Time Will Tell Our Story (Blueberry Hill Records)
- 2008 Our Time (Inside-Out Records)
