= Steve Tushar =

Steve Tushar is an American Latin Grammy nominated record producer/remixer and musician. He has been a keyboardist, remixer, programmer and producer for metal band Fear Factory, record producer for Beto Cuevas and Chroma Key, and keyboard player for the metal/industrial act 16 Volt. Tushar has also done remixes for Korn, Puddle of Mudd and Megadeth, among others.

He is currently a producer, remixer, and sound designer in Hollywood, having worked on movies such as American Wedding, Ghost Rider 2, The Wicker Man, David Lynch’s Inland Empire, Case 39, Darfur Now and Lakeview Terrace.

He was the co-producer of ex La Ley frontman Beto Cuevas's solo project, Miedo Escenico, and had the single "Vuelvo" reach number one and three single status in Argentina and Chile, and number five single in Mexico in the month of October 2008. Tushar also toured with Cuevas and his band as keyboard player and tour director, in support of the album throughout the United States and parts of Latin and Central America and Europe.

Notable solo musical projects include heavy industrial project Carbon 12 and Oscillate. His remix of Megadeth's "Symphony of Destruction" appears in the games WWE SmackDown! vs. Raw 2006 for the PlayStation 2 and Full Auto 2: Battlelines for the PlayStation 3 and PlayStation Portable.

In 2009, the album that Steve Tushar co-produced, Miedo Escenico, was nominated for a Latin Grammy award for Best Rock Solo.

== Notable media articles ==
- Mix Magazine (January 1, 2001)
- La Opinion (March 26, 2008)
- Houston Chronicle (March 29, 2008)
- La Opinion (October 03, 2008)
- Reuters (September 19, 2008)
- Excelsior (September 22, 2008)
- El Mercurio (Chile) (September 20, 2008)
- La Nacion (Chile) (September 30, 2008)

== Awards and notable feats ==
- 2005: Golden Reel Award Nomination, The Chronicles of Riddick: Dark Fury and The Lion King 1½
- 2005: G.A.N.G. Award, G.A.N.G. Award for Best Use of Multi-Channel Surround, The Chronicles of Riddick: Dark Fury
- 2004: Golden Reel Award Nomination, The Jungle Book 2
- 2002: Golden Reel Award Nomination, Jimmy Neutron: Boy Genius
- October 2008: "Vuelvo" hits number 1 on the Chilean Top 20 charts
- October 2008: "Vuelvo" hits number 3 on the Argentine Top Singles chart
- 2009: Latin Grammy Nomination, Miedo Escenico, co-producer
