= Chroma Key =

Musical project of Kevin Moore

- Origin: United States
- Genres: Electronica, ambient, trip hop, jazz rock
- Years active: 1998–present
- Labels: Fight Evil, InsideOut
- Members: Kevin Moore
- Website: chromakey.com

Chroma Key is a band of Kevin Moore, known for his work with the bands OSI and Dream Theater. Although primarily a solo project, several other musicians have recorded as part of the band such as bassist Joey Vera, drummer Mark Zonder, and guitarist Jason Anderson.

Chroma Key's music is a mix of psychedelia, electronica and ambient, with detailed keyboard sounds and a slightly dark mood.

== History ==
=== Departure from Dream Theater and Dead Air for Radios (1994–1998) ===
After more than eight years with the band Moore left Dream Theater in June 1994 in pursuit of his own musical direction. By fall of 1994 Moore relocated to Santa Fe, New Mexico, where much of the first album, 1998's Dead Air for Radios was written and recorded. The first four songs to be recorded were: "Even the Waves", "S.O.S.", "On the Page" and "Mouse" which include excerpts of interviews conducted by Moore of people he had met in Santa Fe. Dead Air for Radios was the first release on Moore's newly formed Fight Evil Records, created specifically for Chroma Key and future releases. In response to a question of whether or not he would tour to support the release Moore explained that after three years with the material he was ready to "just move on", but stated that touring would be more likely "after the next album." Moore denied a "dark" vibe to the album, and preferred to describe it as "emotional or thoughtful". Furthermore he went on to elaborate that the "result of the mood I was in during the period after I left Dream Theater and before I knew what the hell I was going to do with my life.... I don't really think of it as a dark time, but certainly a thoughtful time anyway. I think that kind of shows up on the album."

=== You Go Now (1999–2019) ===
2000's You Go Now was written and recorded in Los Angeles, right before another move to Costa Rica, where Moore lived for three years. In Costa Rica, he began writing and recording ideas for a new Chroma Key album, during the day producing a bi-weekly, activist, musical radio program for Radio for Peace International, a short wave station based in San José. Moore released a compilation of the program—a mix of original music and politically volatile spoken word recordings—as a downloadable album on his official site as Shines Fox1.

=== Graveyard Mountain Home (2003–2004) ===
Moore originally began work on Graveyard Mountain Home in December 2003, but postponed work on more material due to the next OSI album. By this time he had completed two new songs. Moore commented on the sound of the album stating ""The big difference with the new [Chroma Key album] is that there are more real instruments...This new Chroma Key is going to be more organic, and less digital." Moore left Costa Rica at the invitation of former classmate at California Institute of the Arts, Theron Patterson to visit him in Istanbul, Turkey. After two weeks he decided to settle down and record the third Chroma Key album. Moore decided to model the album as a soundtrack to a movie. He chose to use a film within the public domain to avoid copyright issues. Searching the Prelinger Archives he happened upon social guidance film Age 13. Moore wrote music to Age 13 slowed down to half its original playback speed allowing him to compose almost an hour of music. Graveyard Mountain Home was released on November 8, 2004 by InsideOut Music.

=== Unofficial work ===
Since 2015, Moore has had a Patreon page for Chroma Key, collecting crowdfunding for song releases.

== Musical style and influences ==
Chroma Key has been loosely described by Kevin Moore as electronic, trip hop, and pop.

Moore has identified vocalists Peter Gabriel, Roger Waters and Laurie Anderson as his "[oldest] and most basic influences" and early influences as Rick Wakeman and Keith Emerson as well as Jane Siberry. Moreover Moore has also recognized such varied artists, bands and composers as Lisa Germano, Pole, The Cure, John Cage, Karlheinz Stockhausen, The Way Out, Gordons and Japanese band Acid Undertones as influences to his music.

== Discography ==
All Chroma Key releases have been self-produced and recorded in Moore's home studios, the locations of which have changed from album to album.

Studio albums

- Dead Air for Radios (1998)
- You Go Now (2000)
- Graveyard Mountain Home (2004)

Demos

- Music Meant to Be Heard (Demos) (1994–1996)
- This is a Recording: 1994–1997 (1999)
- Patreon Demos (2015–2021)

Singles

- Colorblind – single (1999)
