= List of vocoders =

== Analogue vocoder models ==
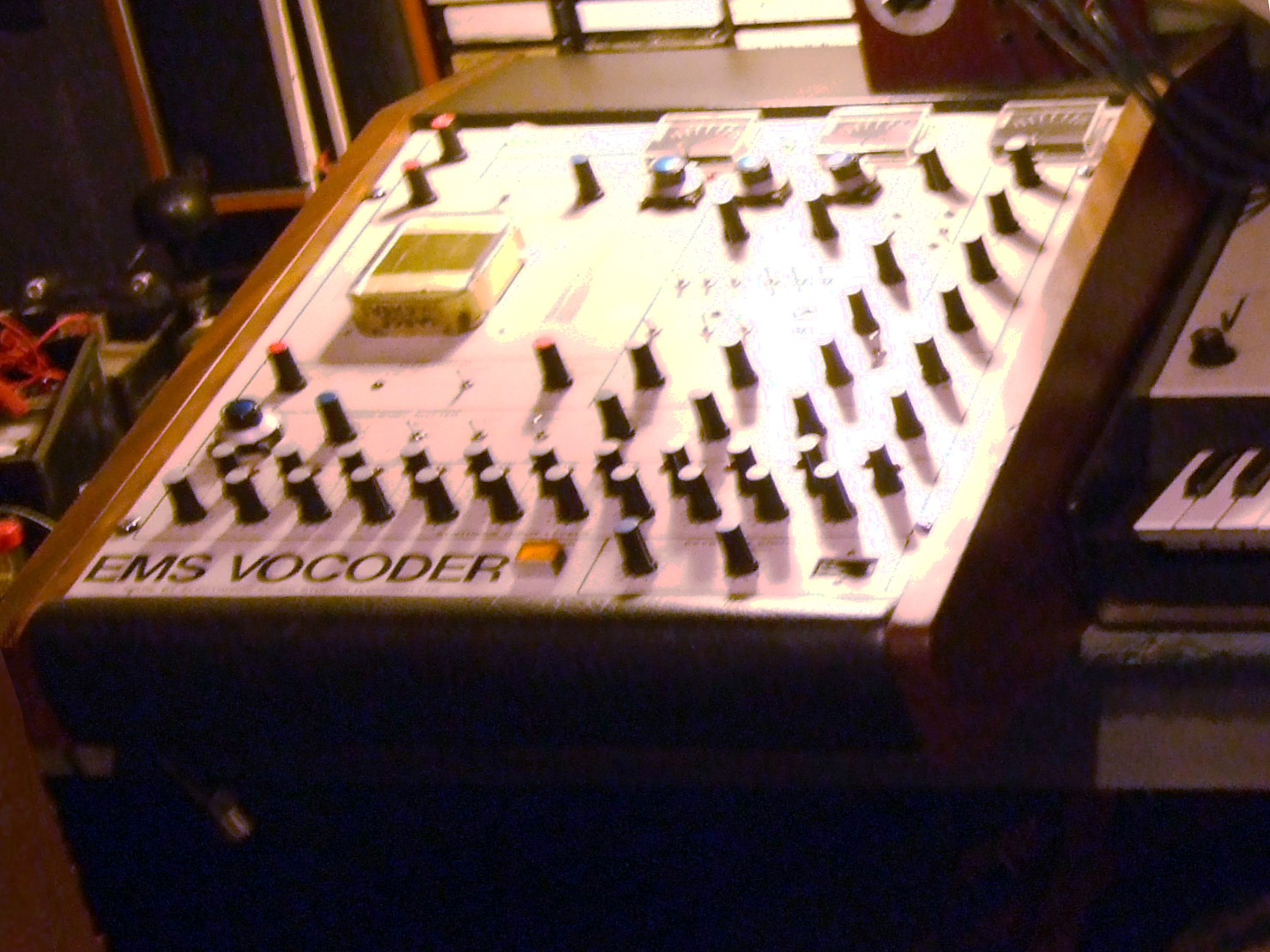
EMS Vocoder 5000 (1976)

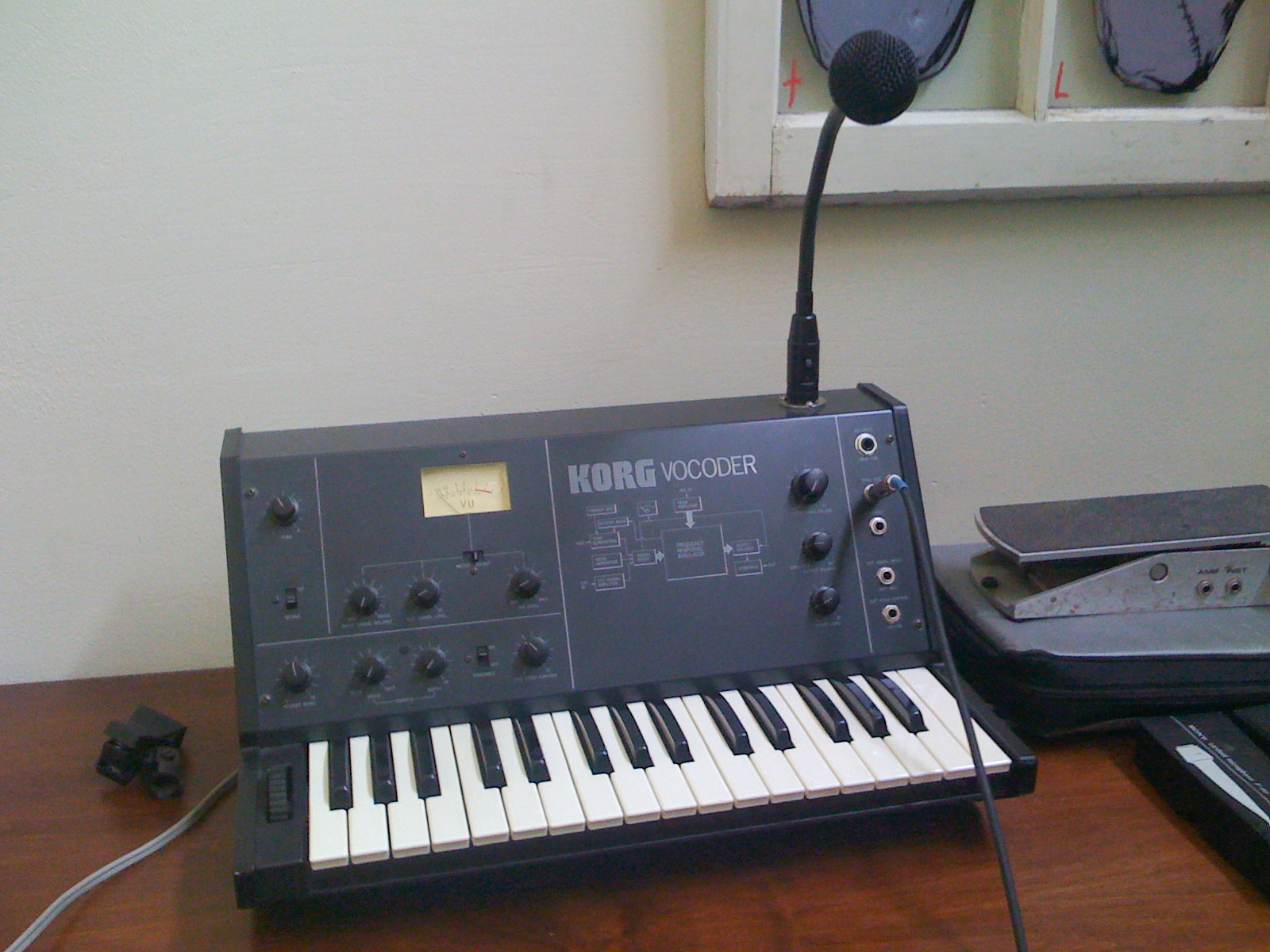
Korg VC-10 vocoder (1978)

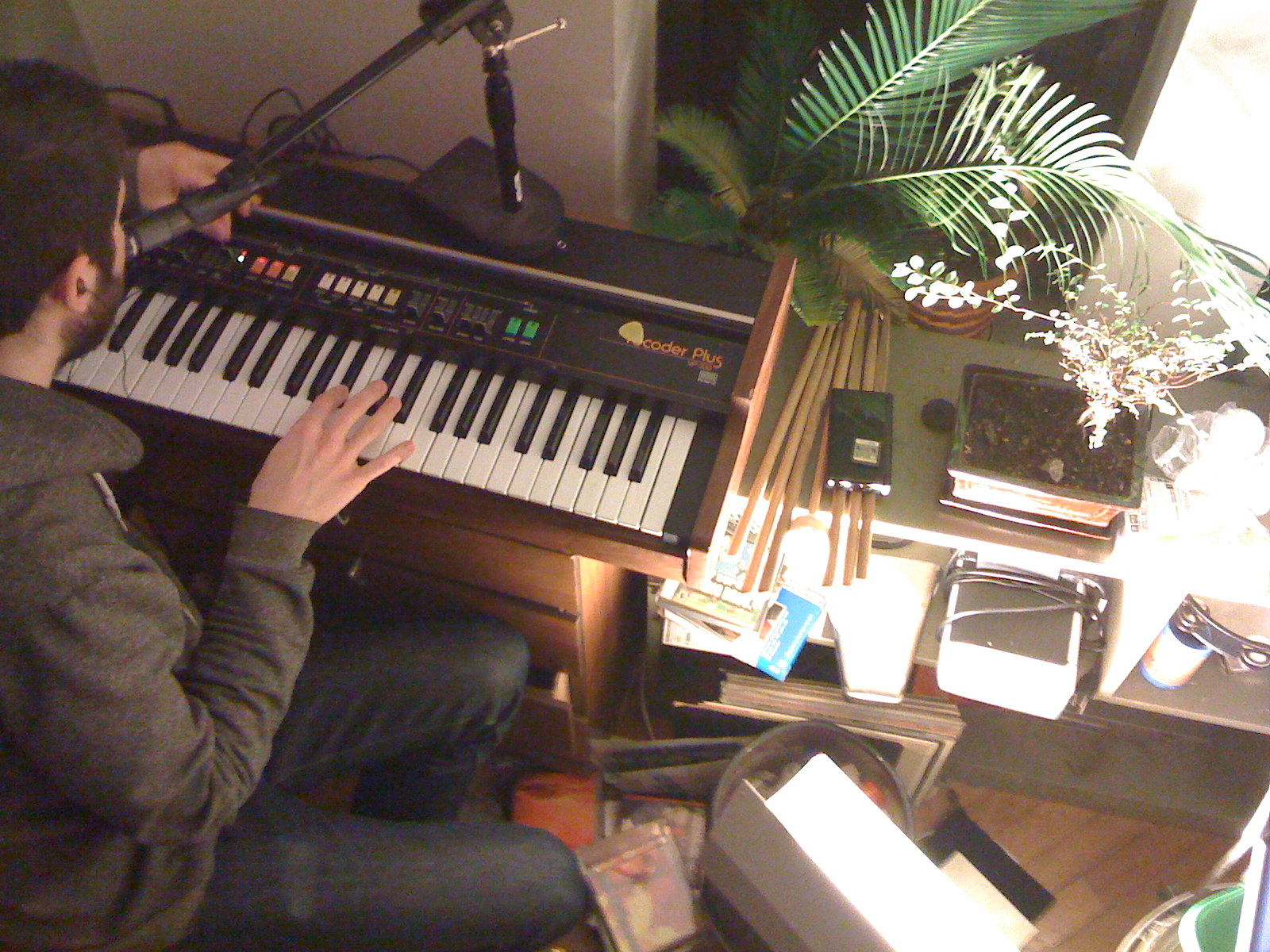
Roland VP-330 Vocoder Plus (1979)

- Analog-Lab X-32 [32-band]
- Behringer VC340 Analog Vocoder
- Bode Model 7702 [16-band]
- Doepfer Modular Vocoder subsystem A-129
- Dynacord SRV66
- Elektronika (Электроника) EM 26
- EMS
  - EMS Vocoder 1000
  - EMS Vocoder 2000 [16-band]
  - EMS Vocoder 3000 [16-band]
  - EMS Vocoder 5000
- Farad - Bruce Haack Custom Model
- Korg VC-10 [20-band]
- Kraftwerk Custom Model (See photo in main article: Vocoder)
- Krok (Крок) 2401 Vocoder (Вокодер) [24-band] (Note: "KROK". Museum of Soviet Synthesizer. — The only Russian rackmount Vocoder, Крок Вокодер)
- MAM Vocoder VF11
  - FAT PCP-330 Procoder
  - Next! VX-11 Vocoder
- Moog:
  - R.A. Moog Modular Vocoder [11-band ?]
  - Moog Modular Vocoder (spectrum encoder-decoder, 10 Band)
  - Moog 16 channel Vocoder (Bode model 7702) [16-band]
- PAiA 6710 Vocoder
- Roland SVC-350 [11-band ?]
- Roland VP-330 Vocoder Plus [10-band]
- Sennheiser VSM 201 [20-band]
- Siemens Synthesizer
- Sky Soundlab (formerly Seekers) Voice Spectra [12-band]
- Synton:
  - Syntovox 202
  - Syntovox 216 [14-band]
  - Syntovox 221
  - Syntovox 222

== Hardware DSP vocoder models ==
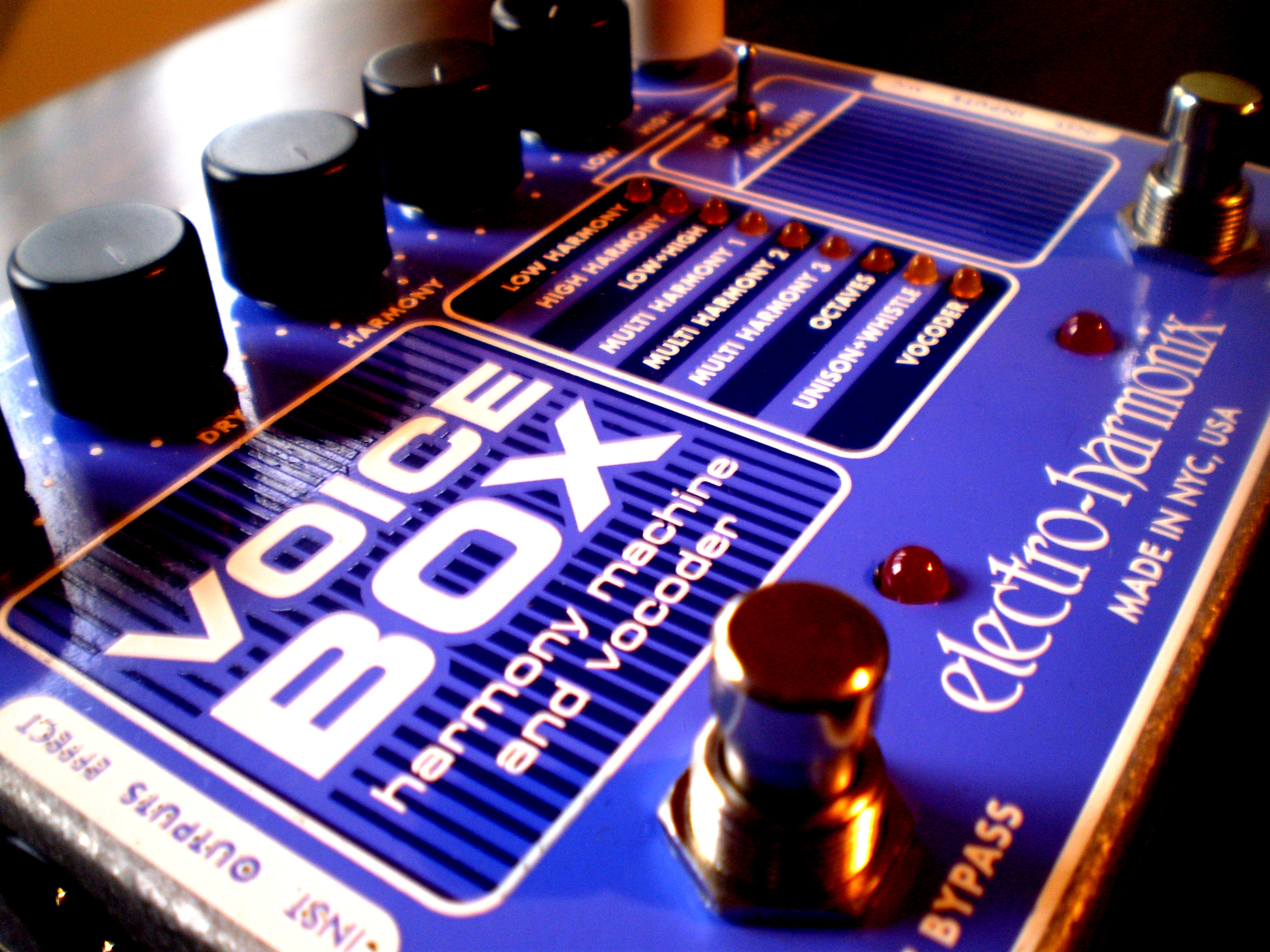
Electro-Harmonix Voice Box

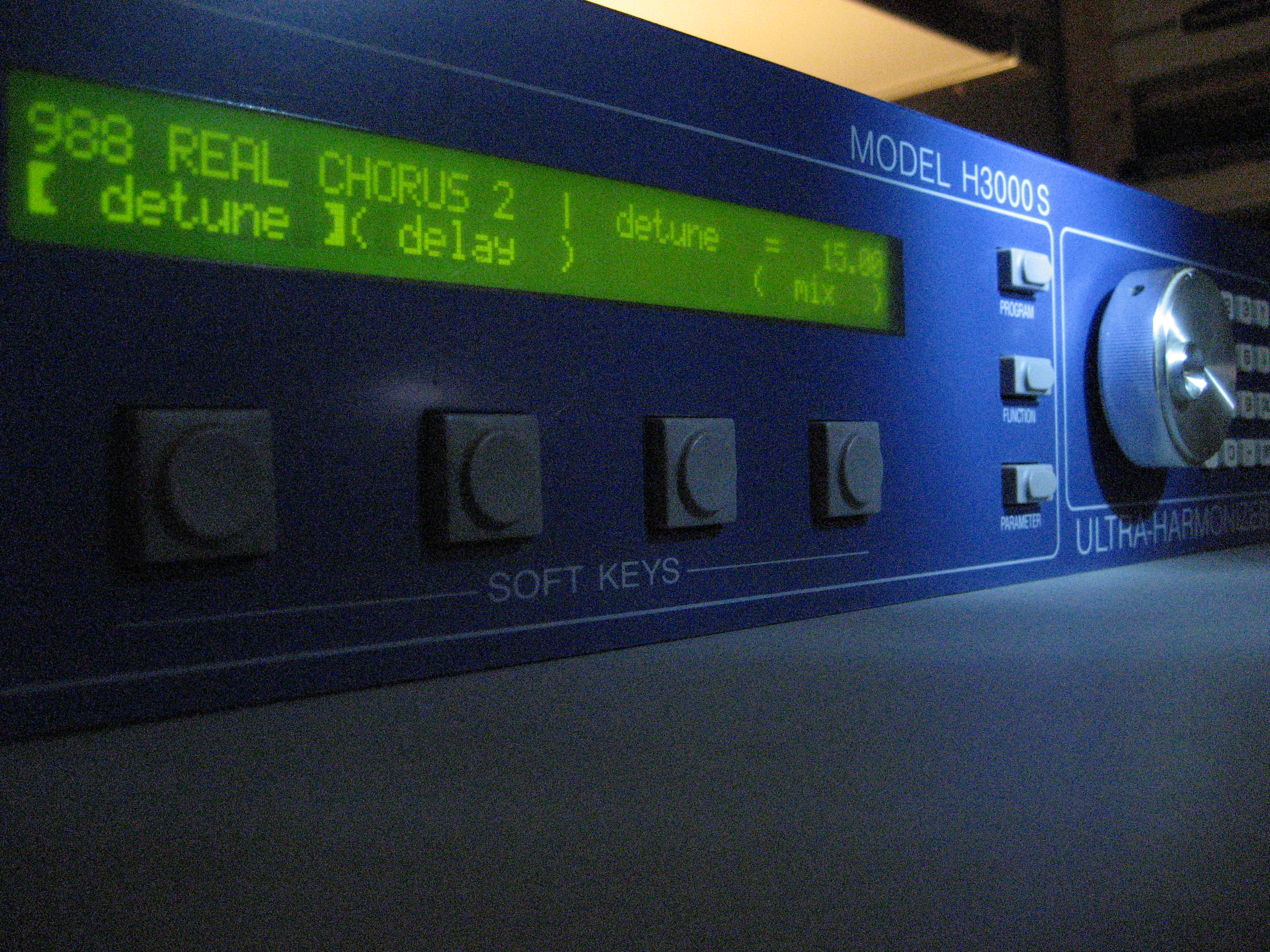
Eventide H3000S(E) Ultra-Harmonizer

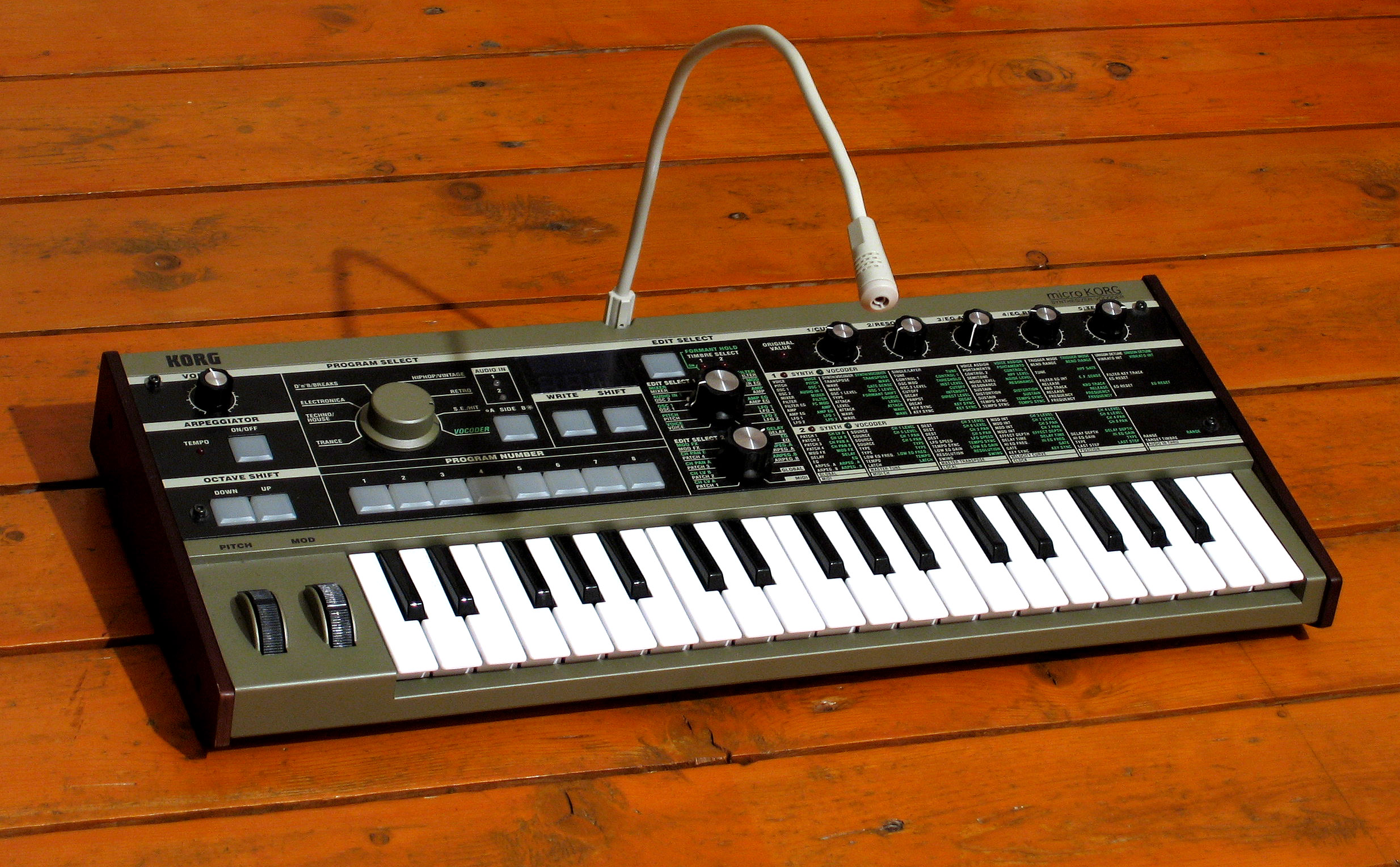
Korg microKORG synthesizer/vocoder

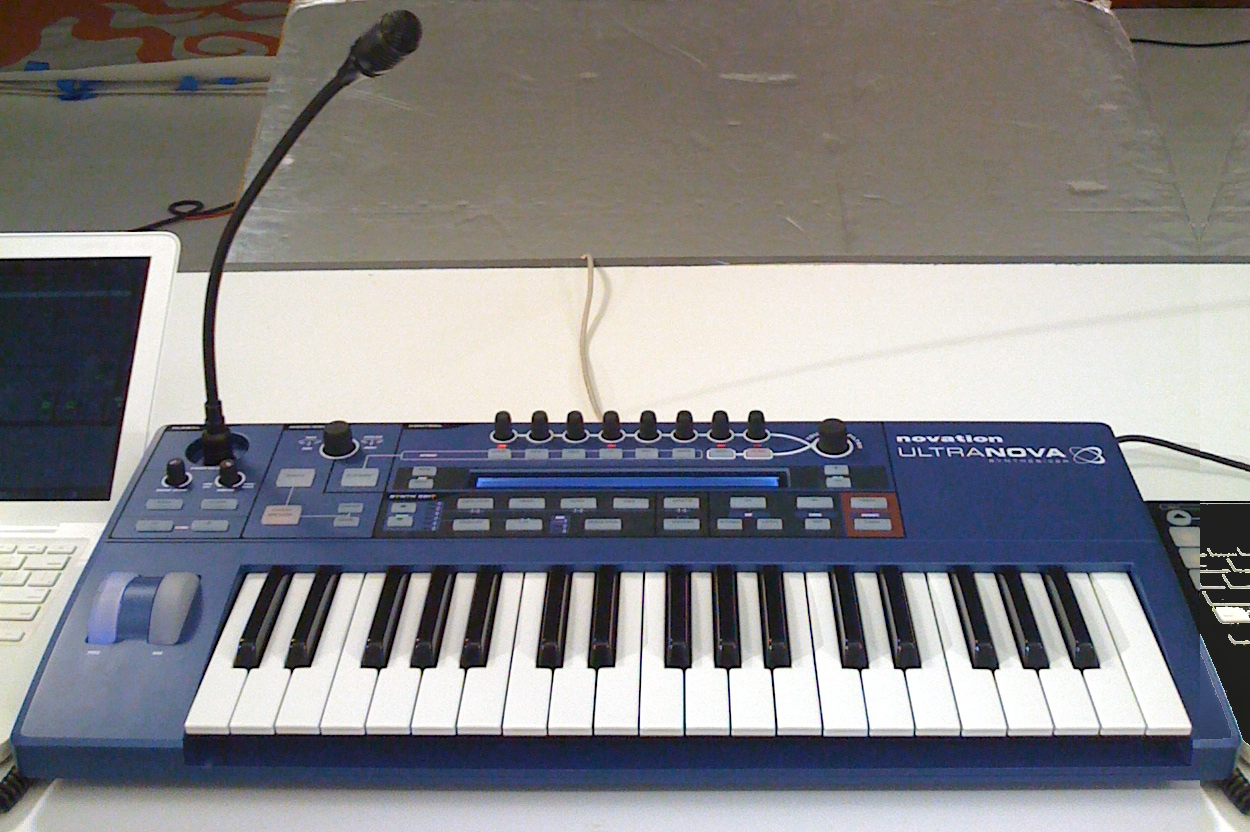
Novation UltraNova

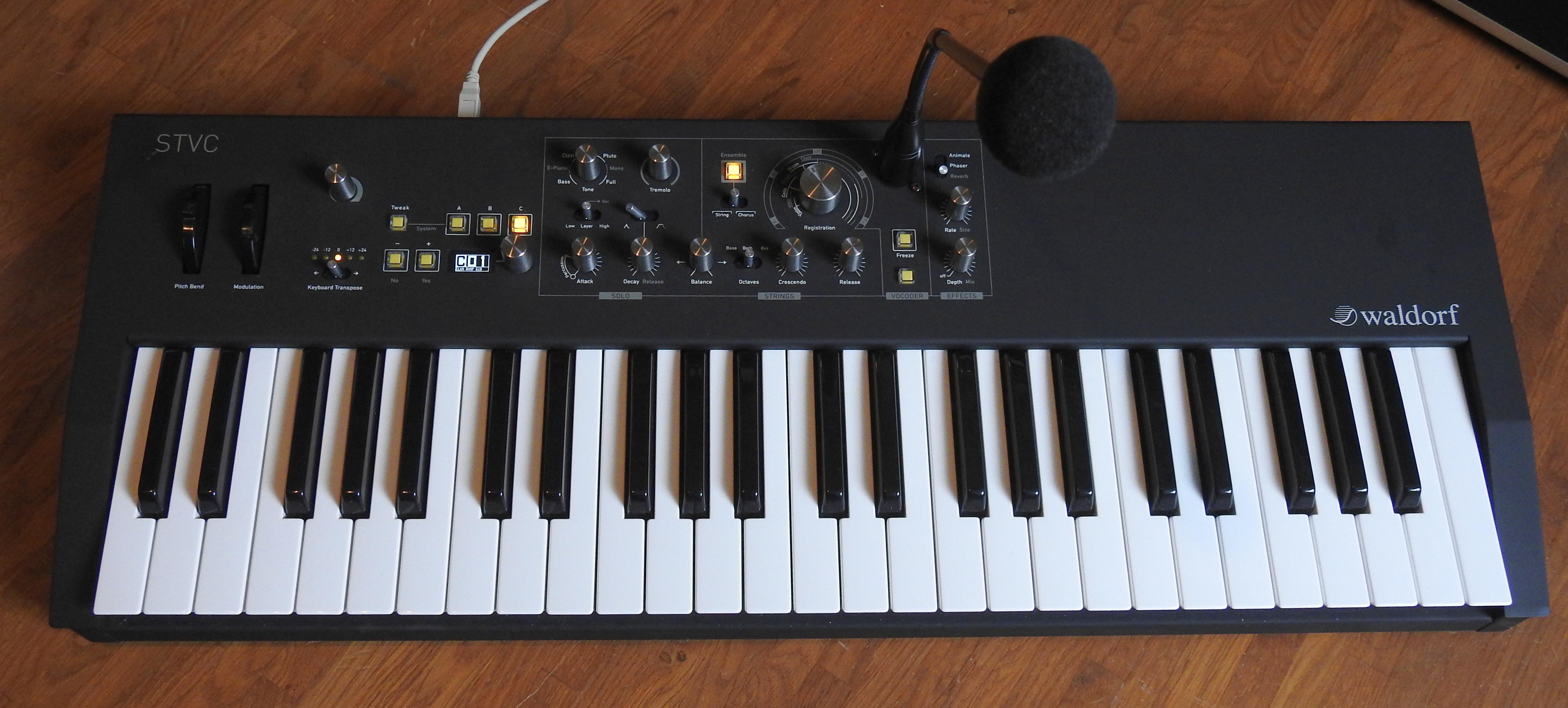
Waldorf STVC string synthesizer with a vocoder

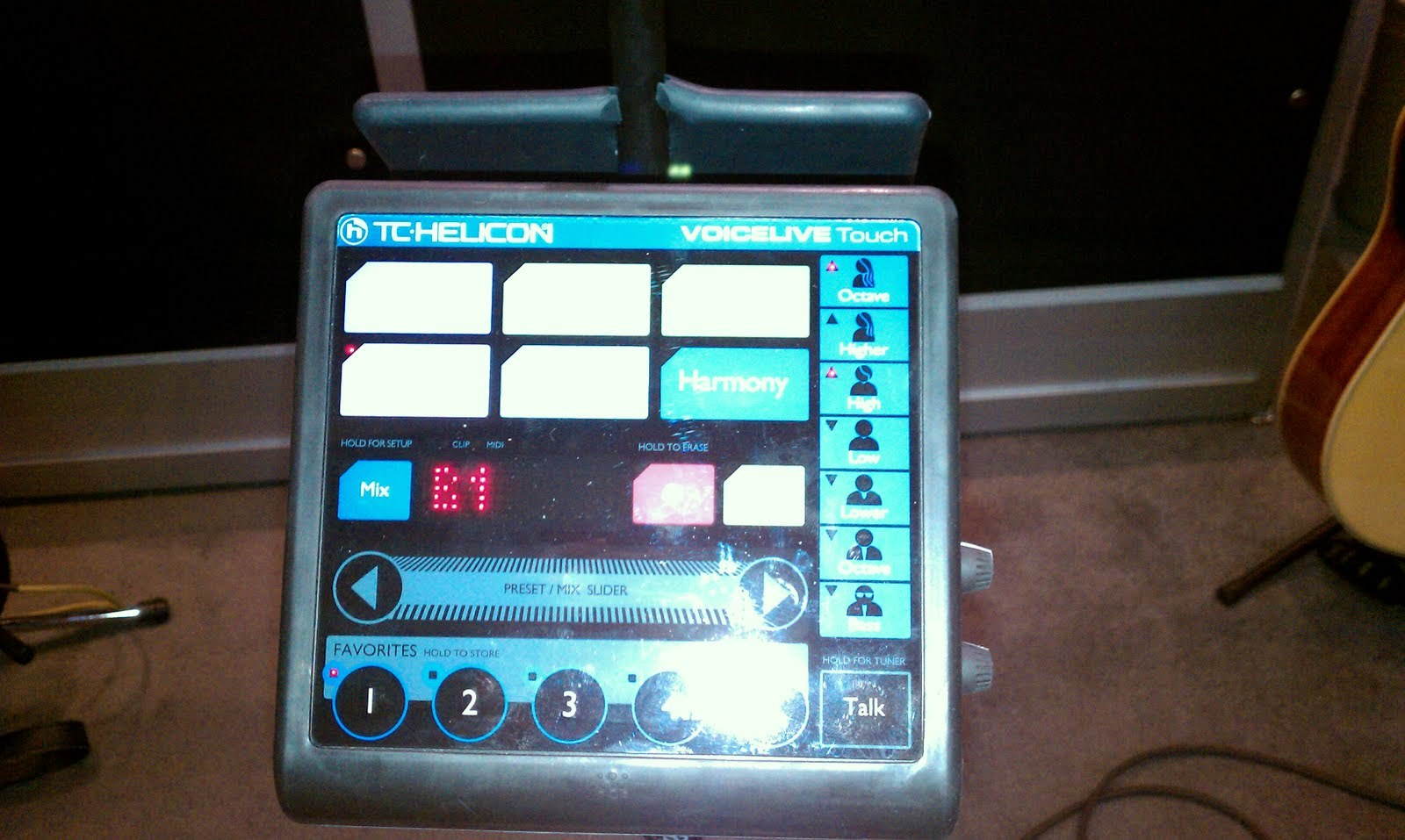
TC Helicon VoiceLive Touch

- Access Virus C Series/Virus TI Series [32-band]
- Akai Professional MiniAK (Virtual Analog Synth) [40-band]
- Alesis:
  - Akira
  - Alesis Ion [40-band]
  - Metavox
  - Alesis Micron [40-band]
- Behringer:
  - 2024 DSP Virtualizer Pro
  - FX2000 Virtualizer 3D
- Clavia Nord Modular
- DigiTech:
  - Talker
  - S100/S200
  - StudioQuad 4
- Electrix WarpFactory
- Electro-Harmonix:
  - Iron Lung
  - V256 Vocoder
  - Voice Box (Harmony Machine and Vocoder)
- Ensoniq
  - DP/4
  - FIZMO
- Eventide Harmonizer
  - SP2016
  - H3000
  - H7600
  - H8000
  - Orvillle
- Korg:
  - DVP-1 Digital Voice Processor
  - microKorg
  - MS2000 [16-band]
  - R3 [16-Band]
  - Radias
  - Wavestation EX
  - Wavestation A/D
  - Wavestation SR (Note: No voice input capability)
  - Triton
  - OASYS
  - M3
  - Kronos
- Kurzweil:
  - K2500 / K2600 (requires sampling option and KDFX)
- Novation:
  - A-station (Analog Modeling Synthesizer Vocoder)
  - K-Station KS4 / KS5 / KS Rack [16-band]
  - Nova / Nova II [40-band]
  - Supernova / Supernova II [42-band]
  - Mininova / Morodernova
  - UltraNova
- Quasimidi Sirius
- Roland:
  - Boss SE-50 [7-band]
  - Boss SE-70 [10-band, 21-band]
  - Boss VO-1
  - JP-8080 [12-band]
  - Juno-Stage [10-band]
  - Juno Di
  - Juno DS
  - JD-Xi
  - JD-XA
  - MV-8000 / MV-8800 [10-Band Vocoder]
  - SP-808 [10-band]
  - VP-03 [10 Band]
  - VP-550
  - VP-70
  - VP-770
  - VP-9000
  - VP-7
  - VT-3 [Internal carrier only, classic robot]
  - VT-4 [Internal carrier, 4 variations, external carrier via USB only]
  - V-Synth
  - System 8
  - Fantom 6/7/8 [up to 32 bands]
- Soundart Chameleon with the Infiltrator "soundskin"
- Symbolic Sound Kyma/Pacarana
- TC-Helicon VoiceTone Synth (HardTune & Vocoder Pedal)
- Waldorf Q
  - STVC (String synthesizer with a vocoder)
- Yamaha
  - Yamaha PLG100VH
  - Yamaha MOTIF XS/XF
  - Yamaha Montage
  - Yamaha MOX6/MOX8
  - Yamaha MOXF
  - Yamaha Tyros 5
  - Yamaha PSR-S975/S775
- Zoom Studio 1201 / 1204 [11-band, 18-band] (Note: 1202 has no vocoder)

== Software vocoder models ==
- Ableton Live Vocoder effect (built-in since version 8.x)
- Apple EVP-1 (component of Logic Studio, originally developed by Emagic as an optional add-on to Logic Audio)
- Arturia Vocoder V
- Eiosis ELS Vocoder (software reproduction of EMS Vocoder 5000)
- EVOC-20
- Image-Line Fruity Vocoder, Vocodex
- Native Instruments Vokator
- Prosoniq Orange Vocoder [24-band]
  - Orange Vocoder
  - OrangeVocoder 3
  - OrangeVocoder 10th Anniversary Edition
- Reason Studios BV-512 [4 to 512-band]
- Superpowered Vocoder
- TAL-Vocoder
- TubeOhm Vocoder-II (Note: "TubeOhm Vocoder-II". TubeOhm. May 30, 2012.)
- VirSyn Matrix Vocoder
- Voice Synth - 3 vocoders with 24 bands, slew rate, stroboscopic gate (iOS and MacOS)
- Waldorf Lector
- Waves Morphoder
- wolton.net 4ormulator
- Zynaptiq Orange Vocoder IV (successor of Prosoniq)
