= Quasimidi Sirius =

Synthesizer introduced in 1997 by Quasimidi

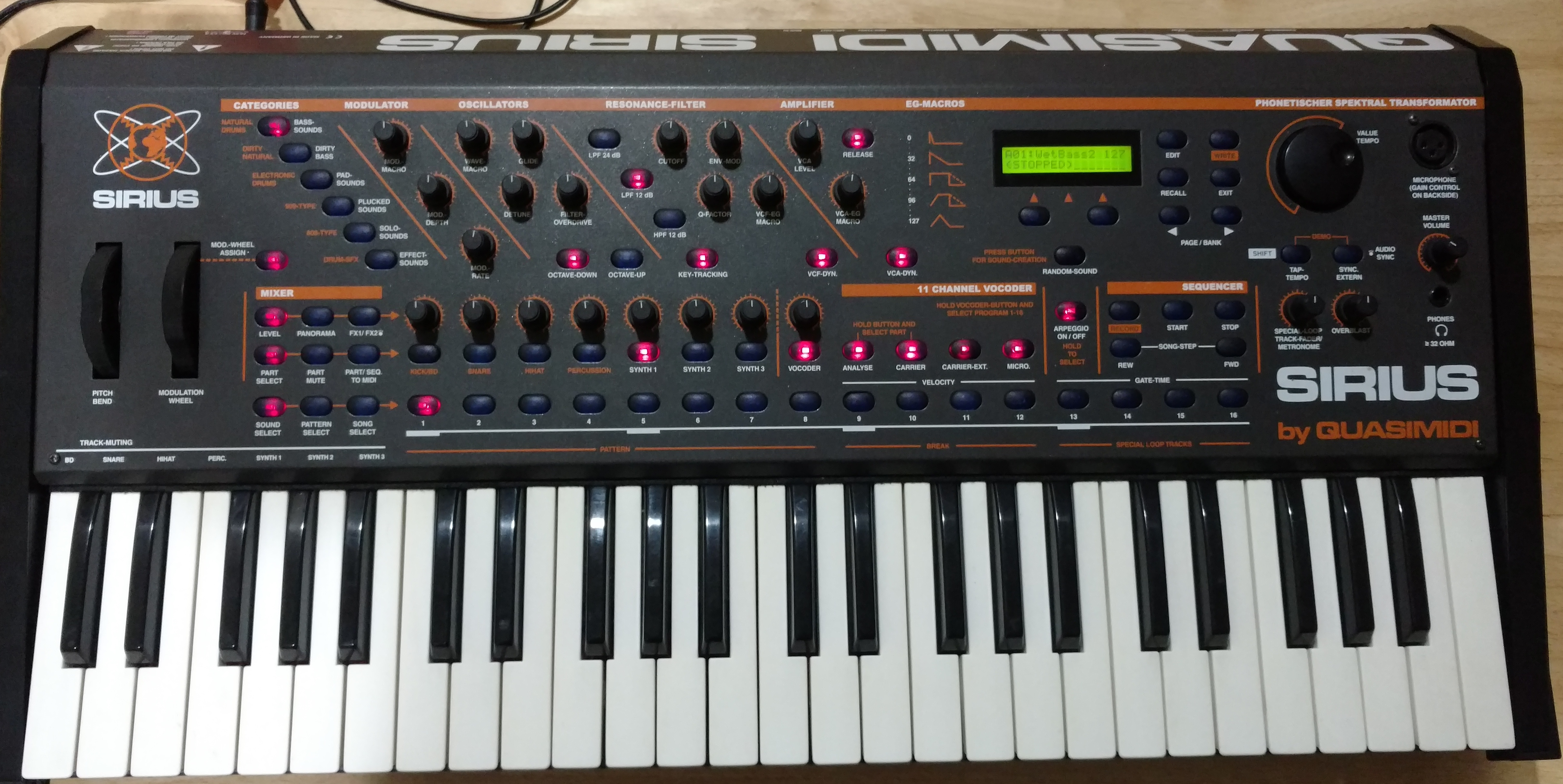
photo of front panel, showing program selection, voice editing, and track controls

The Sirius is a keyboard "groove-synth," featuring a subtractive hybrid-tone-generation synthesizer referred to as DTE ('Digital True Emulation') synthesis introduced in 1997 by Quasimidi. The unit featured both real-time and step sequencers with pattern- and song-modes, capable of acting basic drum machine, groove-box, or sound-module.

The unit is thus 7x multitimbral and has 28-voice polyphony across its 7 tracks, with track selecting a (track-specific) sound within 96 sounds (per bank) of preset- or user-writeable sounds.

Track/voice structure was organized as follows:

1. Kick drum - 1 voice sample through synthesis chain
2. Snare drum - 1 voice sample through synthesis chain
3. Hi-Hat - 2 voice samples (open/closed) through synthesis chain
4. Percussion drum kit - 12 samples through common synthesis chain
5. (chromatic) Synth 1
6. (chromatic) Synth 2
7. (chromatic) Synth 3

...where the first 4 tracks can only load patches from 2 banks (1 ROM and 1 User) of 96 User patches of that instrument, but all 3 (chromatic) synth parts can load from a common pool of 4 banks (3 ROM and 1 User) of 96 keyboard patches.

The onboard pattern sequencer allows for storage of 1600 motifs (MIDI sequence only) to freely assign to sound within Patterns, holding 142 ROM and 100 User Patterns (assignments between motif and Program). The Sirius can store holds 16 Songs, where each Song assigns

- 8 patterns
- 4 breaks (fills pattern to change all parts)
- 4 special loop tracks (momentary-action fill for single Part)
- settings for 2 bus effect
- settings for vocoder

== User Interfacing ==
A distinct layout of front-panel buttons allow for quick and direct selection assignment of tracks to specific voice-patches (within each back of 96), by

1. pressing the Part Select button for the track desired
2. selecting one of 6 Categories button for drum/synth types
3. pressing of 16 buttons in the Sound Select mode.

...with categories of:

- Natural Drums / Bass-Sounds
- Dirty Natural / Dirty Bass
- 909-type / Plucked-Sounds
- 808-type / Solo-Sounds
- Drum-SFX / Effects-Sounds

While the "genre" buttons remain fixed to a single purpose, the 7 Track buttons allow for per-track Part Select, Part Mute, and MIDI sequence routing. The 16 buttons perform multiple duties, including:

- selecting 1 of 16 Songs
- when running patterns w/in a Song, selecting 1 of 8 Patterns, and triggering 1 of 4 Breaks (triggered fills) and/or 1 of 4 Special Loop tracks (momentary pattern variations).
- Sound Selection

== Sound Synthesis and Control ==
In addition to level and pan controls, each track could also be routed to 2 effects engines; 1 for reverb/delay, 1 for modulation delays (delay/chorus/flanger). It also features an 11-band vocoder with flexible track routing to its carrier and/or modulator, and an advanced/programmable arpeggiator/gate-sequencer for automatic rhythms controlled by its 49-note keyboard.

The DTE synthesis method combines a basic sample playback tone generator with virtual analog-like controls. While some of the waveforms are sampled instruments, most of them are merely single-cycle samples of periodic waveforms common in analog modeling synthesizers. The unit is technically a rompler, but its marketing and technical documentation refer to it as virtual analog synthesizer. This is not entirely accurate, given the lack of any options to shape, sync, or ring-modulate VCO's common to real- and virtual-analog synthesis. While sequencing tools and the (preset) sounds of the Sirius were tailored toward 90's techno- and dance-music sounds and workflow, and the models in production held some unresolved limitations and bugs (being the last model produced before the Quasimidi company folded), the synthesis architecture and user interface of the Sirius feature unique innovations (many of which not seen on more modern/successor synthesizers) that may contribute to its niche appeal. Among these, include its particular handling of:

- ... the vocoder
  - In addition to routing the onboard mic- and line-inputs for traditional "talking-synth" applications, any (combination of) tracks could be routed to it as carrier, modulator, or both (for filter-bank effects) with the front-panel buttons.
  - the vocoder acted as an 8th track, with level, pan, and effect-send controls.
- ...the "ARP" (arpeggio, gate, etc.) for rhythm creation, similar to the "motivator" of the Quasimidi Raven.
  - in addition to storing the voice-synthesis settings, each program could store (inherent) arpeggio settings for one of 3 modes:
    - arpeggiator, with options for rhythmic value, constraining arp-length to pattern-length (or running free), and note-handling, using either simple monophonic sorting (up/down/random/etc) or one of 9 "UserArps;" user programmable 8-note poly-phonic note-sorting sub-sequences with per-note accent and swing.
    - "gater," which rhythmically chops the voice amplitude in a rhythmical tremolo
    - "chord," where the played keys will be re-triggered according to a fixed rhythmic rate, or according to the sequencing of a separate part (i.e. pattern of Snare track plays the notes keyed into Synth 2 part)
  - any (one) voice (at a time) could be set to 1 of 16 preset arpeggiator settings. This allowed arpeggiation or rhythmic gating of drum parts, even in conjunction with the Vocoder.
  - Despite each voice storing unique "arp" settings, the engine often exhibited bugs when attempting to operate multiple tracks with Arp settings simultaneously. Switching between tracks while an Arp was running may apply the previously used tracks Arp behavior to the new track (creating unexpected control bugs).
- ...randomization
  - the unit featured a dedicated Random Sound button to randomize the settings for the presently-selected voice (within that tracks drum/percussion/synth architecture).
  - any track could be reassigned to a new randomly selected Motif and sound Program from memory, facilitating improvisational creation and remixing.
- ...organization and inheritance
  - the 96 (per preset- and user- bank) voice programs available to each track were organized into 6-groups (of 16 presets) by character, both for chromatic voice ("clean bass," "dirty bass," "plucked," "pad," "lead," "SFX") and drum voice ("clean acoustics", "dirty acoustic," "electronic percussion," "808," "909," "SFX")
  - Sequencer was stored sequencer data as motifs-per-track within patterns, and songs as sets of (8) patterns. Editing any motif or pattern data would change any pattern or song that used it.
  - changing the character of any UserArp would change any voice that used that UserArp, and any Pattern- or Song or song that utilized that within it sequencing.
- ...knob Macros and multi-tasking
  - a single Wave Macro knob selects the starting waveform (single-cycle or drum rom-ple). Synthesizer voices instantiate 2 detune-able instances of the same waveform, with no option to freely mix or match.
  - the ADSR envelopes for both the filter and amplifier could have all relevant times/levels set from the detailed edit-menu, but the front panel featured an Envelope Macro that morphed the ADSR settings continuously among plug, sustain, and
  - while synthesis knobs (tune, filter, etc.) adjusted such properties of the presently-selected-track's (drum, percussion, or chromatic voice) sound, the 8 dedicated mixer knobs allowed for controlling level/pan/fx-send across 8 tracks simultaneously (i.e. to turn down hi-hat and snare tracks maintaining keyboard and synth-panel focus on Synth track for melody).

== Legacy ==
After Quasimidi Musikelektronik GmbH folded in 2000, the Sirius (and successor the Raven) have maintained consistent pricing and demand. As of 2020, sellers are asking $1000 whole used units, and/or selling original parts.

The Sirius was featured on the December 18, 2020 episode of "Bad Gear", where host AudioPilz noted it's uniquely 1990's techno-centric sounds, design, and workflow.

== See also ==
Sequencer/Sound stand-alone groove-box/keyboards with dance-music centric sounds and controls.

- Quasimidi Rave-O-Lution 309, the company's predecessor "groove-box", with tracks for Kick, Snare, Hat, Perc, and 1 mono Synth line.
- Quasimidi Raven QuasiMidi's "performance keyboard," with 8 Tracks: Kick, Snare, HiHat, Perc, Bass, Seq1, Seq2, Chords
- Roland JX-305, a contemporary "groove-synth" of similar time and functionality, with 7 melodic tracks + 1 drum track, Realtime Phrase Sequencing (RPS) infrared D-beam, and effects.

Multi-timbral/multi-channel MIDI sound-modules with internal sequencers, pitched voices, drums, performance-effects, and flexible multi-timbral routing of a built-in vocoder.

- Korg_RADIAS, 4 timbres per program, (up to 1 Drum Kit of 12 drum voices), 1 arpeggiator, 2 assignable Sequencers, flexible bus-routing of timbres to carrier and/or modulator
- Novation_Digital_Music_Systems Novation KS-series. 4 timbres/program (up to 1 Drum Map of 48 drum sounds), Arpeggiator, Reverb/Delay/Modulation/Distortion, and HyperSync Beat Fx.
- Access Virus, 16 timbres on 16 MIDI channels

== Notes ==
- Johnson, Derek (October 1998). "A Sirius Matter". Sound on Sound. Archived from the original on 6 June 2015.

== Manual ==
http://z-universe.dyndns.org/php/download.php?file_name=/manuals/sirius_manual_english.pdf%5B%5D
