= Analog modeling synthesizer =

Algorithm used to emulate analog synthesizers

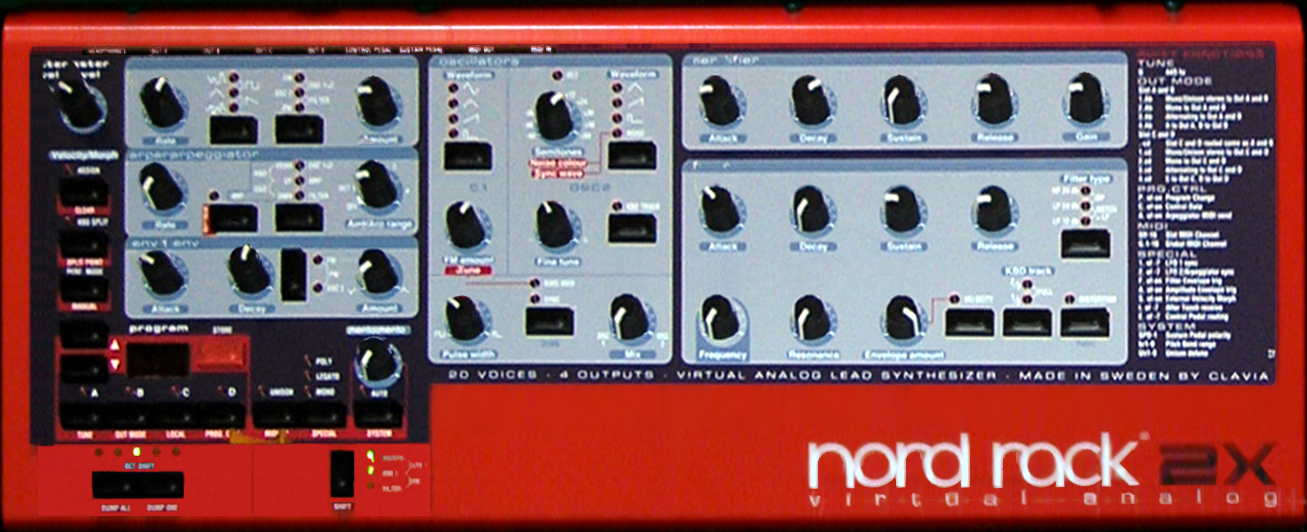
Clavia Nord Rack 2X from the Nord Lead series

An analog modeling synthesizer is a synthesizer that generates the sounds of traditional analog synthesizers using digital signal processing components and software algorithms. Analog modeling synthesizers simulate the behavior of the original electronic circuitry in order to digitally replicate their tone.

This method of synthesis is also referred to as virtual analog or VA. Analog modeling synthesizers can be more reliable than their true analog counterparts since the oscillator pitch is ultimately maintained by a digital clock, and the digital hardware is typically less susceptible to temperature changes.

While analog synthesizers need an oscillator circuit for each voice of polyphony, analog modeling synthesizers do not face this problem. This means that many of them, especially the more modern models, can produce as many polyphonic voices as the CPU on which they run can handle.

Modeling synths also provide patch storage capabilities and MIDI support not found on most true analog instruments. Analog modeling synthesizers that run entirely within a host computer operating system are typically referred to as analog software synthesizers.

While the Roland D-50 from 1987 is probably the first affordable virtual analog synthesizer, the term was not used until the 1990s when the Nord Lead came out.

Examples of VA synthesizers include:

- Access Virus line of VA synths
- Akai Miniak virtual analog synthesizer from Akai Professional
- Alesis Ion, Micron and Fusion
- Arturia Origin
- Clavia Nord Lead and Nord Modular series
- Korg Z1, Prophecy, MS-2000, microKORG, RADIAS, R3, KingKORG, Electribe
- Kurzweil PC3-family
- M-Audio Venom
- Novation Supernova, Supernova II, Nova, A-Station, K-Station, X-Station, XioSynth, Ultranova, MiniNova
- Oberheim OB12
- Quasimidi Raven, Rave-O-Lution, Polymorph, Sirius
- Roland JP-8000, JP-8080, V-Synth, SH-201, SH-01 Gaia, JU-06, SH-32, Aira System-8, Aira System-1
- Waldorf Q, Q+, MicroQ and Blofeld
- Yamaha AN1x, Yamaha Reface CS, AN200
