= MicroKORG =

Synthesizer released in 2002

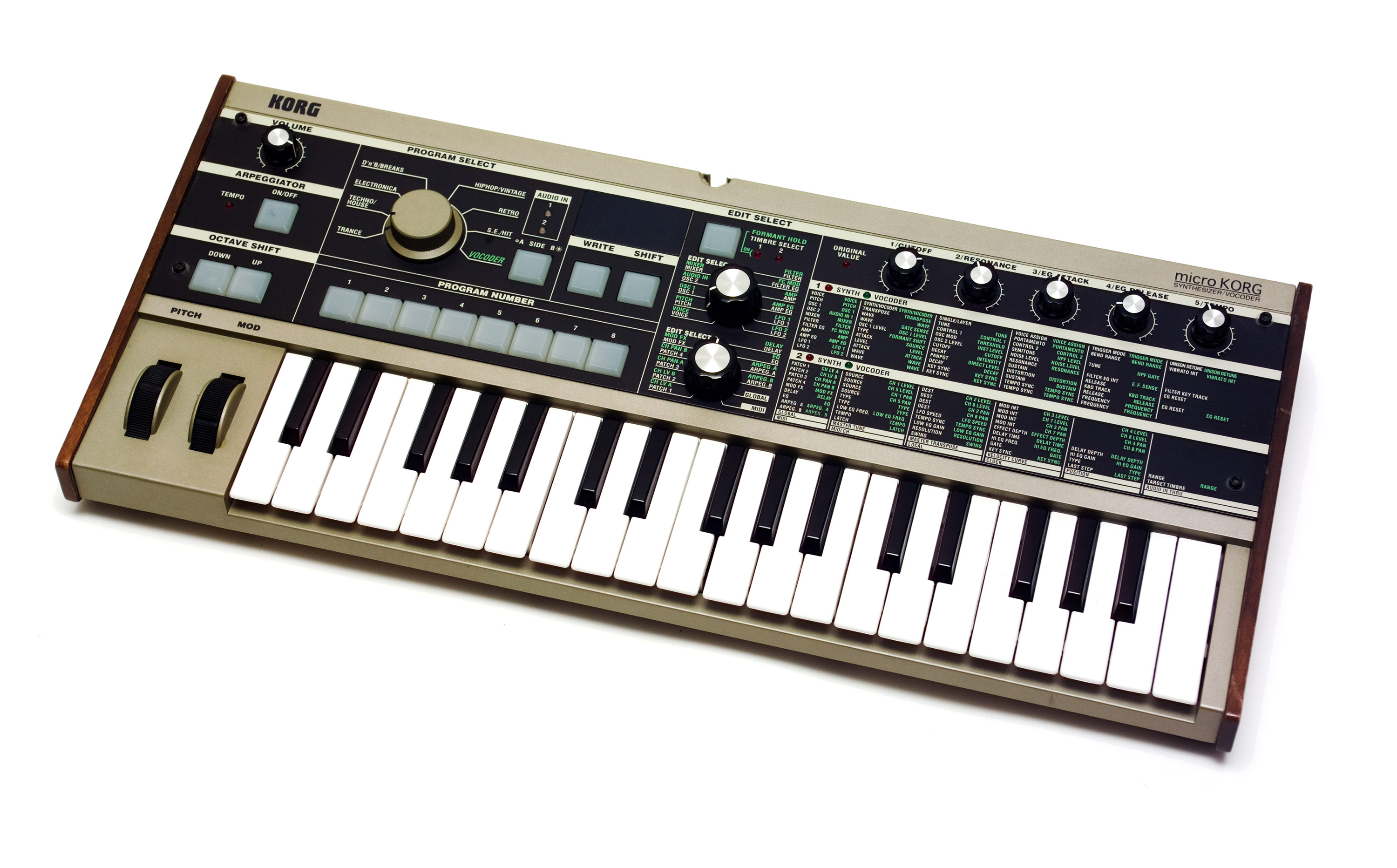
The original microKORG

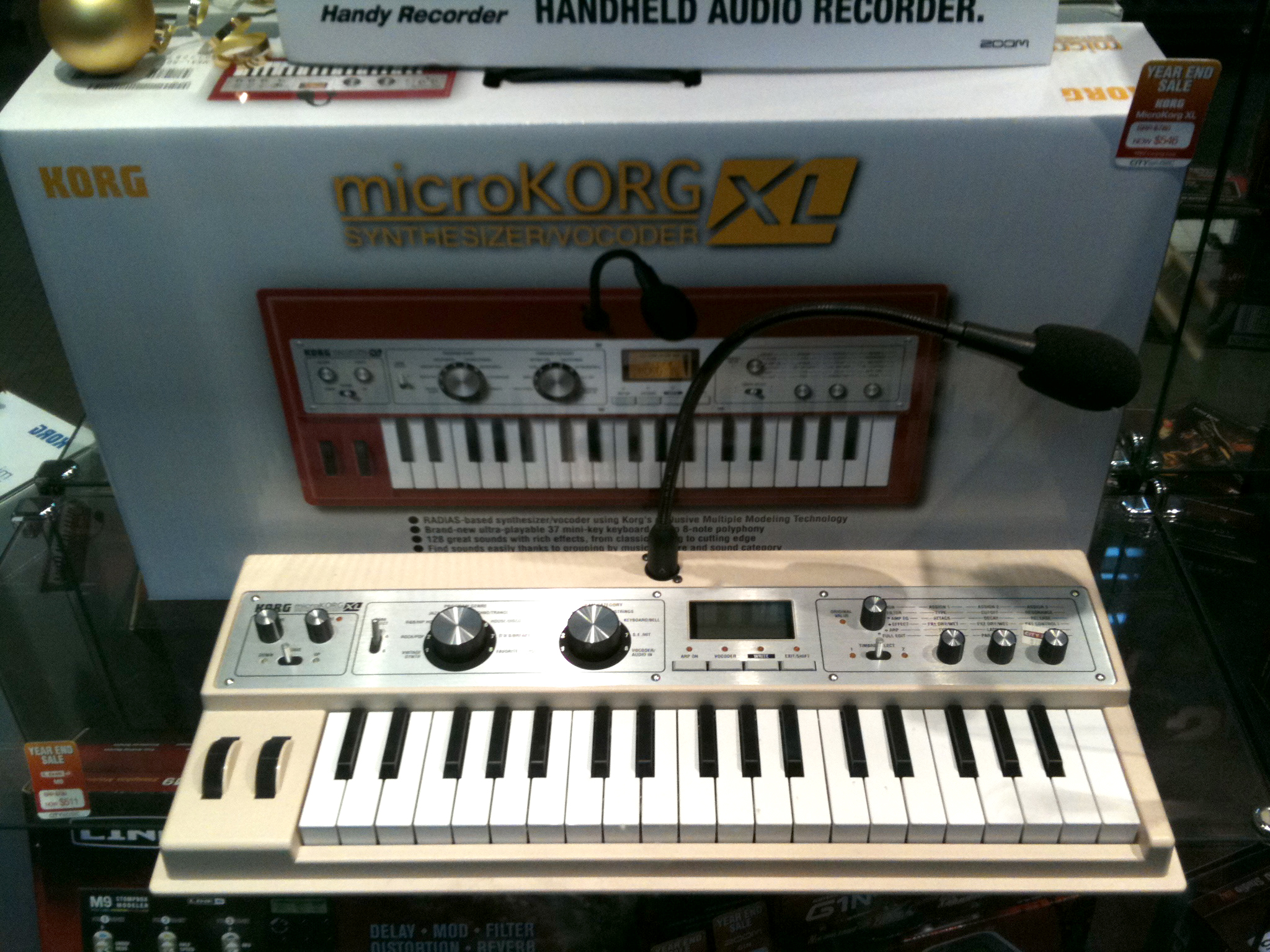
The microKORG XL

The microKORG is a MIDI-capable digital synthesizer/vocoder from Korg featuring DSP-based analog modelling. The synthesizer is built in such a way that it is essentially a Korg MS-2000 with a programmable step arpeggiator (the MS-2000 has only six simple patterns), a less advanced vocoder (8 bands instead of 16 bands on the MS-2000), lack of motion sequencing (MS-2000 had three motion sequences), lack of an XLR microphone input, and in a smaller case with fewer real-time control knobs.

The microKORG was released in 2002 and is still in production as of 2022. It has sold an estimated 100,000 units sold as of May 2009. In September 2007 Korg released a limited edition of the microKORG with reverse-color keys, although the functionality was otherwise unchanged. At NAMM 2008, a successor dubbed the microKORG XL was introduced. Available since early 2009, it uses Korg's MMT (Multi Modeling Technology) engine, borrowed from the newer and more powerful Radias/R3 synthesizers. Also, in late 2016, a slightly updated version was released, dubbed the MicroKORG S. This edition retains the same sound engine as the original MicroKORG, but offers an integrated speaker system (stereo + sub), updated color scheme & twice the patch memory. In 2022, a VST Version was released as part of the Korg Collection.

Notable users of the microKORG include Kevin Parker, Ethan Kath and the two members of MGMT.

== Synthesis ==
The microKORG features a DSP-based synthesis engine, designed around the same engine found in the Korg MS2000. In Korg's terminology, the fundamental unit of sound is referred to as the "timbre". Each timbre consists of a pair of multi-function oscillators. Two timbres can be combined in one patch to create a four-oscillator "layer", which can in turn be used to create more complex sounds (although doing so halves the polyphony from four notes to two) Oscillator one (OSC1) can produce one of several virtual analog-style waveforms, including sawtooth, square, triangle, and sine waves. Alternatively, OSC1 can produce a so-called "VOX" wave (which simulates human vocal formants), white noise, and one of 64 different digital waveforms created via harmonic additive synthesis. Some of these 64 waveforms (which are really single-cycle wavetables) were originally featured in the Korg DW-6000 & DW-8000 digital-analog hybrid synthesizers of the mid 1980s. The second oscillator (OSC2) is limited to sawtooth, square, and triangle waveforms.

microKORG Saw Wave

microKORG Square Wave

microKORG Triangle Wave

microKORG Sine Wave

microKORG Vox Wave

microKORG Digital Wave (64 values)

microKORG White Noise

Demonstration of the microKORG being played. These samples are taken from the song 'Radio', by British synthpop band Emile's Telegraphic Transmission Device. We hear organ chords, a melody played on three presets, a middle eight; also on three presets and a synth bass preset.

Each waveform on OSC1 has a unique modulation feature, including wave morphing, Pulse-width modulation, and FM. OSC2 can be detuned, synchronized, and/or ring-modulated with OSC1 in order to create more complex sounds. OSC1 can also be replaced with the signal from one of the line-level inputs on the back of the unit, allowing for external signals to be processed as if they were an oscillator (via the filters, effects, or even ring-modulated by OSC2).

For further shaping of the sound, the microKORG offers several types of digital filters, including Low Pass (-12dB/Oct and -24dB/Oct), Band Pass (-12dB/Oct), and High Pass (-12dB/Oct) modes.

Additionally, the unit provides a number of built-in effects, such as flanger, ensemble (chorus), phaser, and digital delay, all of which can be applied to external signals. For modulation, there are two independent LFOs, with six different waveforms, allowing for the creation of more complex, time-varying patches.

When playing a single timbre, the keyboard is limited to four-voice polyphony. In layer mode it generally has only two-voice polyphony, although one combination of polyphonic/mono layers allows for effective three-voice polyphony of the second timbre.

The microKORG groups its 128 factory preset sound patches into 8 groups:

- Trance
- Techno/House
- Electronica
- D'n'B/Breaks
- Hip hop/Vintage
- Retro
- Special Effects/Hit
- Vocoder

A large knob changes the selected sound group. Each group has 16 different patches (two banks of eight); the active patch is selected by the eight LED-illuminated buttons on the front panel, while the accompanying A/B switch toggles between the two banks. All patches are user editable, and do not necessarily have to align with the genre groupings listed on the faceplate.

== microKORG S ==
In 2016, Korg reissued the microKORG as the modified 'microKORG S'. This edition retains the engine and features of the original microKORG (as opposed to the XL/XL+, see below), but includes a new lighter-colored housing, built-in speakers, twice the original patch memory (256 slots) and a Favorites feature to assign 8 patches to the program buttons for easier selection.

== microKORG XL ==
microKORG XL
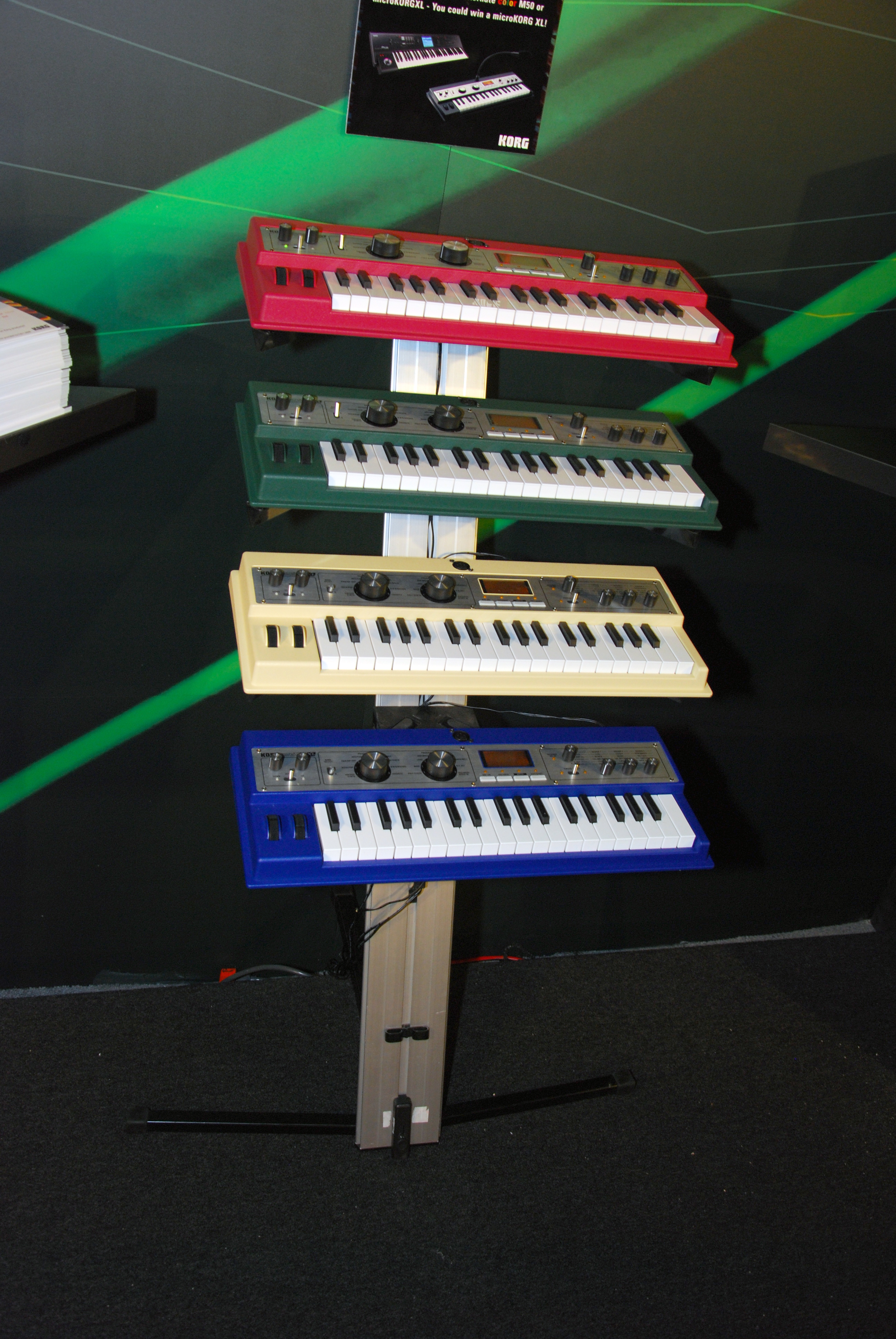

The direct successor to the microKORG, the 'microKORG XL', utilizes the MMT (Multi Modelling Technology) engine, and is based on Korg's own R3 synthesizer. The XL features a brand-new LCD and two large Program Select knobs for easier patch access, though has fewer real-time controls than the original microKORG.

The microKORG XL groups its 128 factory preset sound patches into 8 groups:

- Vintage Synth
- Rock/Pop
- R&B/Hip Hop
- Jazz/Fusion
- TechnoTrance
- House/Disco
- D'N'B/Breaks
- Favourite

and several sub categories:

- Poly Synth
- Bass
- Lead
- Arp/Motion
- Pad/Strings
- Keyboard/Bell
- Special Effects/Hit
- Vocoder

=== New features specific to the microKORG XL ===
Notably, the 'microKORG XL' features 17 different KAOSS derived effects, including phaser, flange, decimation, vibrato, tremolo and retrigger. The XL also features several included PCM Waveforms, including Piano, Brass Ensemble, nine Electric Piano and Clavinet, seven organ sounds (one of which emulates the Korg M1 Organ), a full String Orchestra, two variable formant waves and more than 32 digitally generated waveforms (SYNWAVE 6 is a ramp wave/inverted sawtooth). The XL adds two additional Waveform Modulation types: Phase Modulation and Unison (in which five stacked oscillators within 1 oscillator can be detuned and phased to achieve a richer sound.) The Unison Simulator is similar to the Supersaw waveform on the Roland JP-8000. The included "OSC MOD WAVEFORM" and "OSC2 SYNC" controllers are reminiscent of the Poly-Mod feature in the Sequential Circuits Prophet-5. The microKORG XL also includes a waveshaper (uncommon in most synthesizers) which will morph the current waveform into an approximation of the waveform desired, resulting in a harsh sound. The waveshaper also includes a third oscillator (Sub oscillator.)

Additional improvements include:

- Polyphony increased up to eight notes
- Vocoder increased to 16 bands, but still supports the 4 note polyphony
- USB connector for MIDI over USB operation
- "Split" and "Multi" added to Voice modes
- The option to use ten scales, including one defined by the user.
- "Analog Tune" simulates the pitch instability and oscillator “drift” that was characteristic of vintage analog synthesizers

== Korg RK-100S ==
In 2014, Korg announced the RK-100S keytar, which is essentially a 37-key "keytar" version of the 'microKORG XL+', with many external differences and only two internal differences. On the inside, it sports the same exact features as the 'MicroKorg XL+', except it has 200 program storage instead of 128, and allowing for the long ribbon controller to serve as a modulation source. Externally the RK-100S is radically different, it lacks the ability to edit programs from the unit. Editing may only be done via a control app available for Mac and PC, and if one is daring enough, it is technically possible to create ones own editor using the available MIDI messages chart. 'MicroKORG XL' and 'XL+' patches may be downloaded into the unit one-by-one or en-masse, allowing patch editing to be done on a 'microKORG XL+'.

=== Notable external differences of the RK-100S ===
- Lacks the XLR mic input and dual quarter-inch mono output jacks of 'microKORG XL+', instead featuring a stereo 1/4" TRS jack and mono 1/8" audio input jack, switchable between three gain levels (Line, Mic1, Mic2)
- Adds a short and long ribbon controller, and buttons that toggle the behavior of the ribbons (e.g. between modulation of pitch or frequency, although other things can be modulated)
- Sports a 37-key keyboard of "mini" keys as on the MS 20 Mini; these are larger than microKORG'S keys but much thinner than traditional keys
- Has five banks of "favorites" selectable with five LED-backlit buttons; these buttons serve as a level meter for output volume during normal performance
- A multipurpose up/down lever switch used for selecting between programs, banks, adjusting tempo, etc.
- Wooden body with very fragile glossy lacquer paint that is very easy to chip or crack should the unit bump into anything hard
- Double the battery life for a set of 4 alkaline AA batteries (8 hours instead of 4 on the microKORG XL+), according to Korg's documentation.

Even though the RK-100S is not marketed as a microKORG, the fact that its synthesis engine is identical makes it ideal for microKORG users wishing to perform live without needing to have a keyboard stand restricting their movement around a stage.
