= Quasimidi =

Defunct German synthesizer manufacturer

Quasimidi Musikelektronik GmbH was a German synthesizer manufacturer from Hesse. It was founded in 1987 by Friedhelm Haar and Jörg Reichstein. It was originally based in Kirchhain, but moved to Rauschenberg in 1998. The company folded in 2000.

During the early part of its life, the company produced MIDI master keyboards, and later the Quasimidi Styledrive, which could store and replay MIDI sequences and SYSEX/CC messages. The company also produced an upgrade kit to expand the capabilities of the popular Roland E-20 keyboard, as well as several ROM cards for the E-20 offering additional accompaniment styles.

Subsequently, they became notable for their range of synthesizers, which were aimed primarily at the dance music market of the day. Their first popular synthesizer was the Quasimidi Quasar, a rack-mounted digital synthesizer module which was released in 1993. The presets and drum sounds eschewed the typical General Midi specification, which was in vogue at the time, in favour of electronic and trance techno styles. The Quasar included an arpeggiator, which was an unusual feature in 1993.

Whereas the Quasar was a two-unit rackmounted box, Quasimidi's subsequent instruments migrated into the desktop & full-size form factors. Quasimidi was one of the first modern synthesizer companies to re-introduce knobs, lit buttons, and dials to synthesizer control interfaces, notably with the Quasimidi Rave-O-Lution 309 of 1997. This was a module which combined a pattern-based sequencer with a drum section and a synthesizer section. It competed in the "groovebox" market segment against Roland's popular MC-303. Quasimidi released a keyboard version of the Rave-O-Lution, as the Quasimidi Sirius, which included a built-in vocoder.

Quasimidi also built the Raven, a full size sample-based Virtual Analog synthesizer, which offered a unique sequencer implementation, allowing for the keys to be used both for muting/unmuting and transposition of tracks. It also featured real and step time recording, in the style of Roland TR-type drum machine sequencers. The Raven could be upgraded with the so-called "MAXX" expansion board, increasing the internal PCM capacity from 6 mb to 14mb.

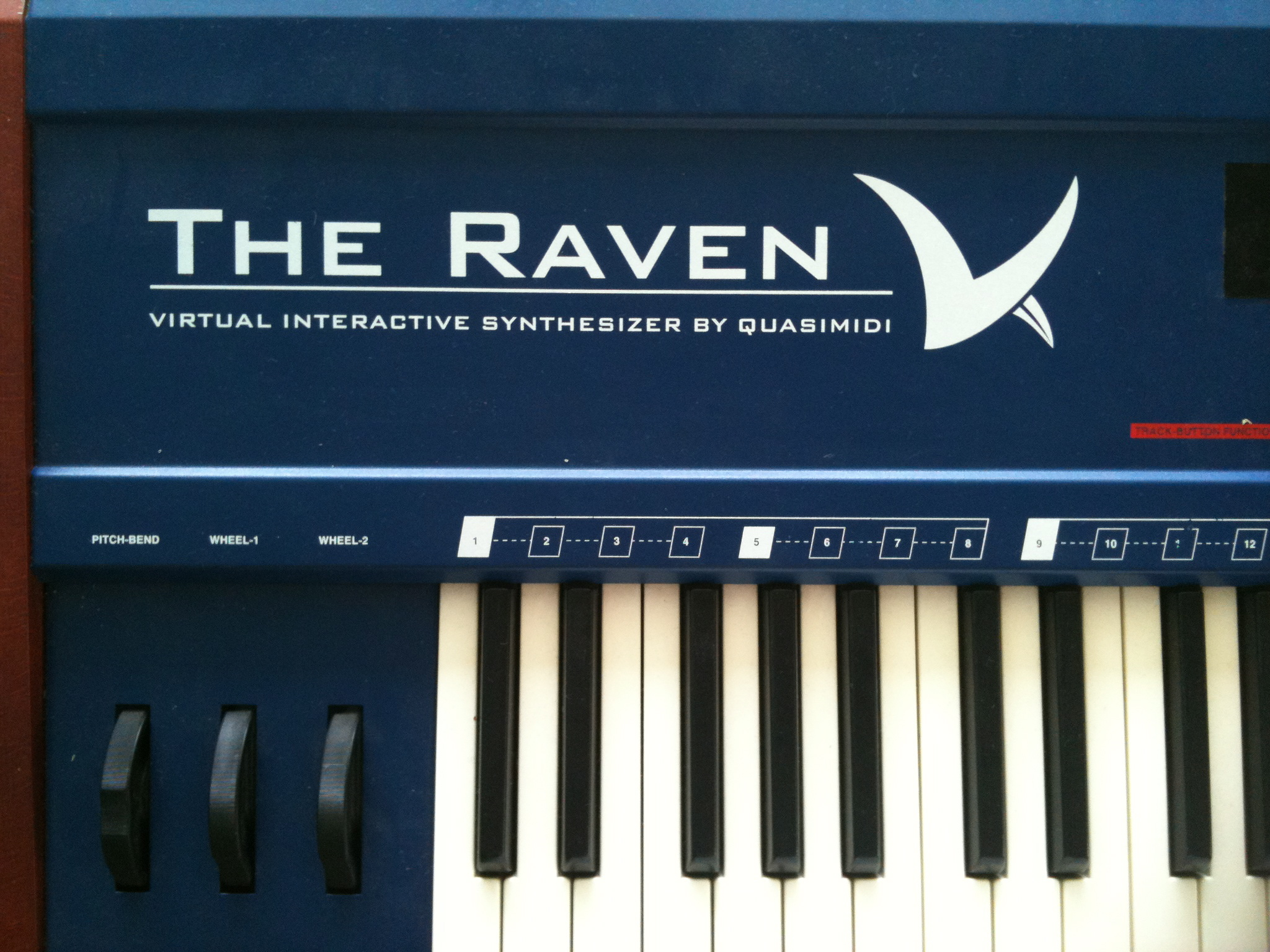
Quasimidi Raven

Quasimidi also built a master keyboard dubbed the Cyber 6, which shared the same casing as the Raven, albeit with a few cosmetic differences. The Cyber 6 was a 61-note controller keyboard with aftertouch, featuring two separate MIDI output ports which allowed for simultaneous control of up to 32 independent MIDI channels. The keyboard itself could be split up into zones & layers, with each zone being able to transmit on its own MIDI channel, and allowing for individual zone-based transposition. It also contained an 8-track sequencer, in the same vein as the Raven, in addition to a number of built-in arpeggiator patterns, referred to by Quasimidi as "Motivators".

Quasimidi's final product was the Polymorph, a successor of the Rave-O-Lution. Although the company's products were popular, Quasimidi went out of business in 2000.

== Partial product listing ==
- Quasimidi Caruso (1993)
- Quasimidi Quasar (1994) synth module
- Quasimidi Raven (1995) dance music synth
- Quasimidi Cyber 6 (1995) master keyboard
- Quasimidi Technox (1995) synth module
- Quasimidi Rave-O-Lution 309 (1996) synth module/groovebox
- Quasimidi Sirius (1997)
- Quasimidi Polymorph (1999)
