= Quasimidi Polymorph =

Synthesizer released in 1999

Polymorph
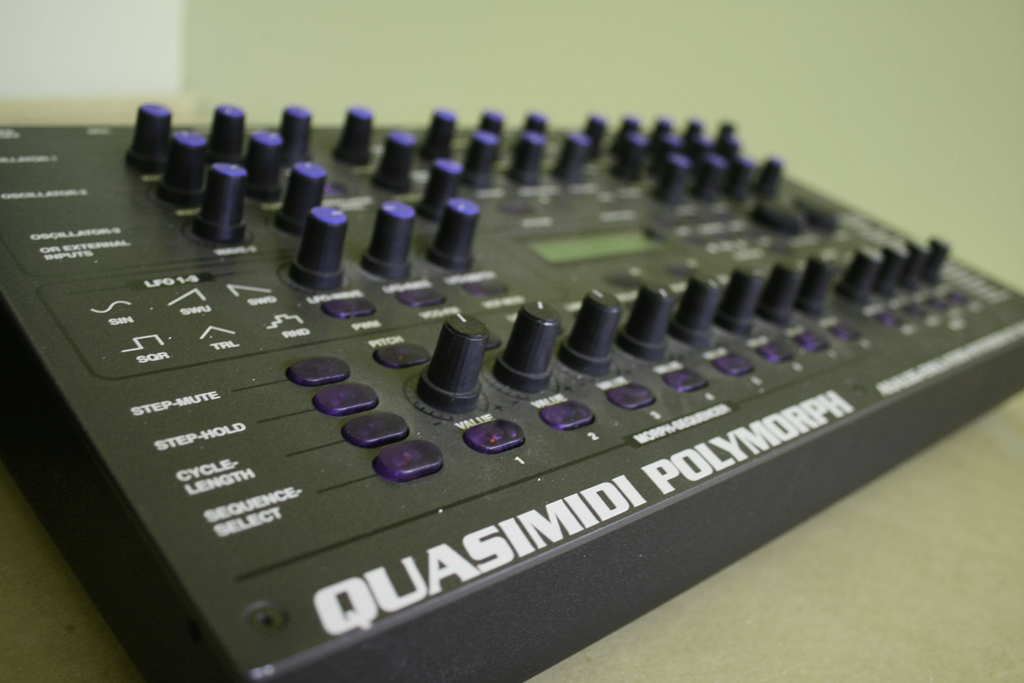
- Manufacturer: Quasimidi
- Dates: 1999

Technical specifications
- Polyphony: 8-16 voices
- Timbrality: 4-part
- Oscillator: 2-3 per voice
- LFO: 3
- Synthesis type: Sample-based synthesis; Physical modelling synthesis
- Filter: HPF, LPF
- Storage memory: 128 patches; 64 performances
- Effects: Chorus, delay, distortion, flanger

Input/output
- Keyboard: No
- External control: MIDI (In, Out, Thru)

The Quasimidi Polymorph sequencer and synthesizer was released by Quasimidi in 1999. The synthesiser is a full featured and powerful Analog emulation synthesizer that assumes an evolved form and purpose of its predecessor - the Quasimidi Rave-O-Lution 309 which was released in 1996.

== Sound ==
The Polymorph is basically four synths loaded with synth and drum sounds, geared towards electronica and other forms of synthesizer music. Individual ADSR envelope generators and filters per oscillator make for a totally tweakable and flexible synthesizer.

== Sequencer ==
The sequencer: 16 step, 8 variations, 4 parts or instruments. Parts and even notes can be muted or changed in real time to build and decompose grooves or synth textures. There are also preset phrase patterns to play around with.

== Effects ==
Can be assigned to each of the four parts independently

- Distortion
- EQing
- Reverb
- Chorus
- Flange

== Controls ==
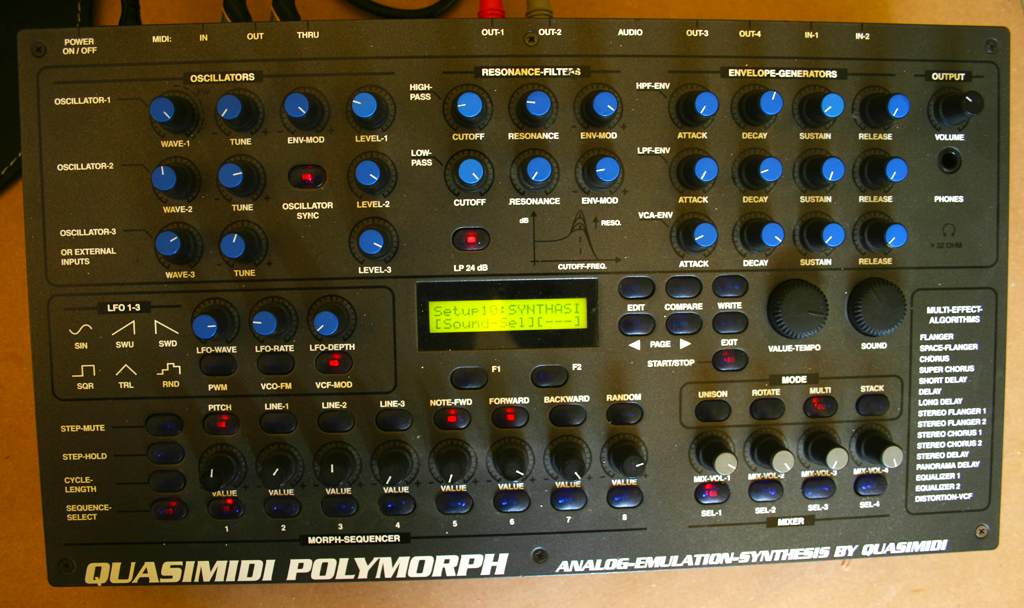
The control surface of the Polymorph

The controls, knobs and sequencer can all be controlled via MIDI for in-studio use; however the impressive multi-effects implementation is a major hint that the Polymorph is a machine suited for live, DJ and on-the-fly music production.

== Used by ==
- Orbital
- Jean-Michel Jarre
- Prodigy
- Klaus Schulze
