= Roland JD-XA =

Hybrid digital-analog crossover synth from Roland

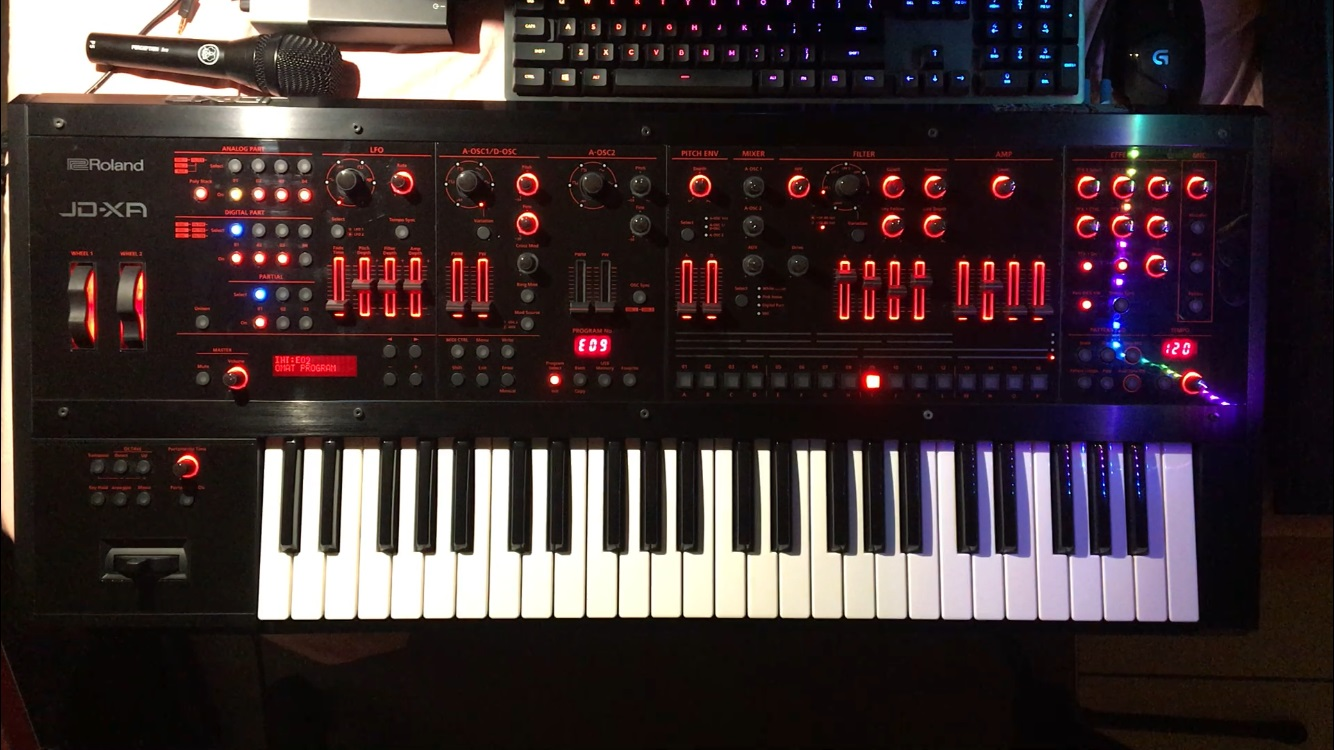
- The Roland JD-XA pictured here in a YouTube video
- Manufacturer: Roland
- Dates: 2015-
- Price: US$2,499

Technical specifications
- Polyphony: 4 analog, 64 digital
- Timbrality: 4 analog monophonic, 1 analog polyphonic, 12 digital (4 digital parts, 3 partials per part)
- Oscillator: 2 DCOs per analog part, one oscillator or PCM waveform per digital partial (3 partials per part)
- LFO: 2 per voice
- Synthesis type: analog subtractive, digital additive, 450 PCM waveforms
- Filter: 1 per voice
- Aftertouch expression: Yes
- Velocity expression: Yes
- Storage memory: 256 patches internal + USB port
- Effects: 120

Input/output
- External control: USB, MIDI

The Roland JD-XA is a hybrid analog and digital synthesizer that was released in 2015 alongside the JD-Xi, it is Roland's first analog polyphonic synthesizer since 1986. The instrument is encased by a shiny black front panel covered with knobs and sliders reminiscent of the Roland JD-800. The JD-XA comprises a 4 voice analog engine and a 64 voice digital engine, which can be used interactively or independently, thus providing a flexible platform for sound design.

== Notable users ==
- Gary Numan
- Nick Rhodes
- Scott Tibbs
- Shimron Elit
- Ulrich Schnauss (Tangerine Dream)
