= System-1 Aira =

Synthesizer developed by Roland in 2014

Roland System-1 - Plug-Out Synthesizer
- Manufacturer: Roland
- Dates: 2014 - 2022
- Price: 490EUR / $470

Technical specifications
- Polyphony: 4 voices
- Oscillator: 4
- LFO: 2
- Synthesis type: Oscillator-based
- Filter: 2 (LPF HPF)
- Aftertouch expression: Only over Midi
- Velocity expression: Only over Midi
- Effects: 4

Input/output
- Keyboard: 2 octave
- External control: USB and regular MIDI

Roland System-1 is a Plug-Out Synthesizer, based on the System 100, System 100M, and the System 700.

In short, the System-1 has two oscillators to produce sounds. They can ring modulate each other. There is also an LFO to modulate the other 2 oscillators. This all can produce a wide variation of sounds.

In a mixer the sounds of the 2 oscillators can be mixed with a sub-oscillator and a noise generator; a filter-section puts an ADSR envelope (Attack, Decay, Sustain, Release) to the sounds. An Amp-section can influence the volume output, using an ADSR envelope too. Both ADSR are controlled each by 4 sliders.

As with the other Aira products, the System-1 has a Scatter function, which can reform the sounds to more variations.
