= Roland JD-Xi =

Analog/digital synth from Roland corporation

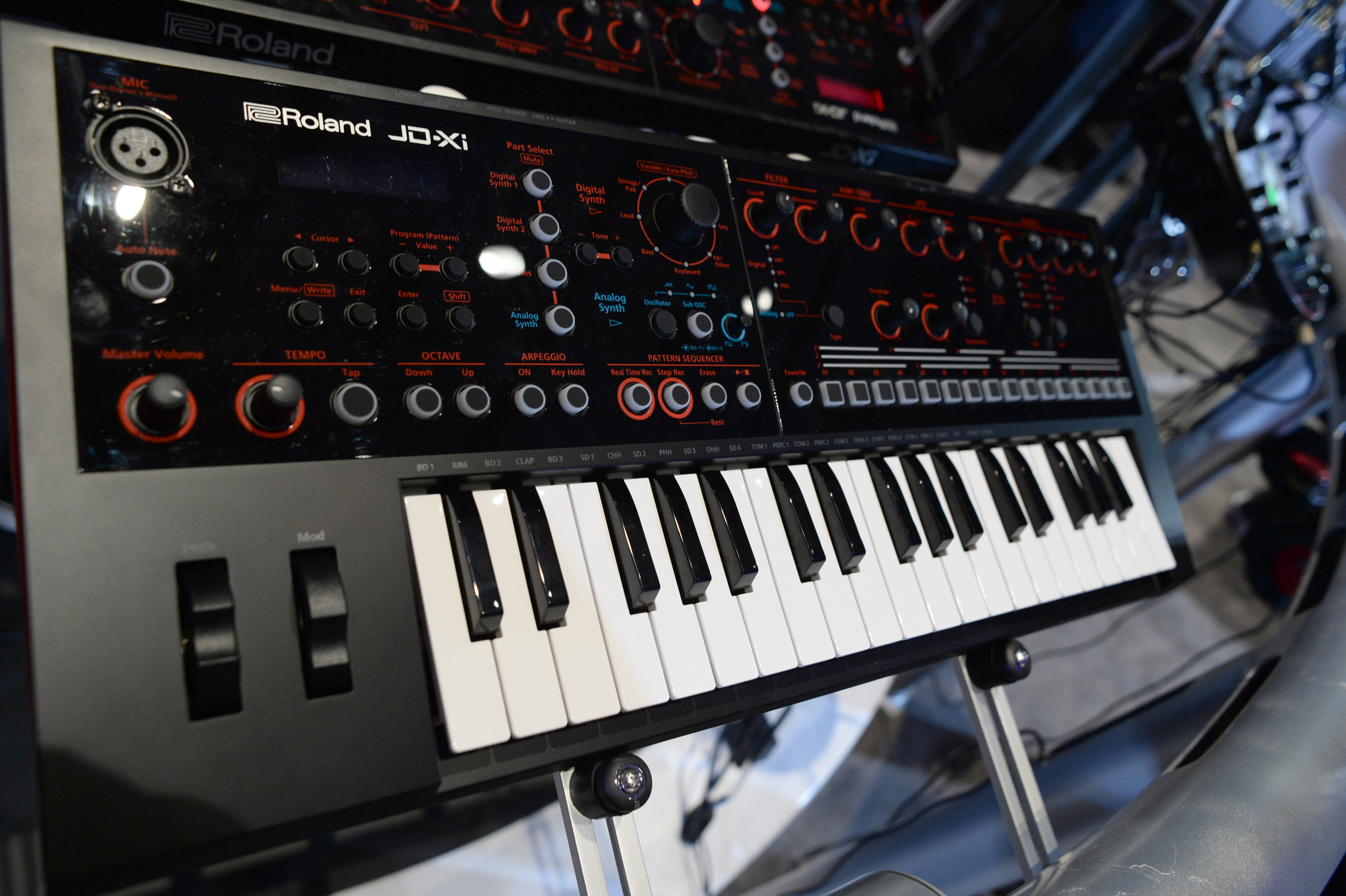
- The Roland JD-Xi
- Manufacturer: Roland
- Dates: 2015–
- Price: US$599

Technical specifications
- Polyphony: 1 analog, 128 digital
- Timbrality: 1 analog monophonic, 10 digital (2 digital parts with 3 partials per part, 1 drum part with 4 partials)
- Oscillator: 1 DCOs for the analog part, one oscillator or PCM waveform per digital partial (3 partials per part for digital synths and 4 partials for the drum track)
- LFO: 1 per voice
- Synthesis type: analog subtractive, digital additive, 450 PCM waveforms
- Filter: 1 per voice
- Aftertouch expression: No
- Velocity expression: Yes
- Storage memory: 256 patches internal + USB port
- Effects: 16

Input/output
- External control: USB, MIDI

The Roland JD-Xi is a hybrid analog and digital synthesizer that was released in 2015, together with the larger JD-XA. The JD-Xi comprises a 1 voice analog engine and a 128 voice digital engine (Roland's Supernatural engine) with 2 synth tracks and 1 drum track; in total 4 separate tracks, which can be used interactively or independently. The JD-Xi includes a Vocoder engine with a gooseneck microphone built in. A limited edition white version ran for a limited time in 2015.

== Notable users ==
- Nick Rhodes
- Warren Ellis
- Mike Dean
- Shiloh Shaddix (Life Is Shit)
- UVERworld
