= Korg RADIAS =

Synthesizer introduced in 2006

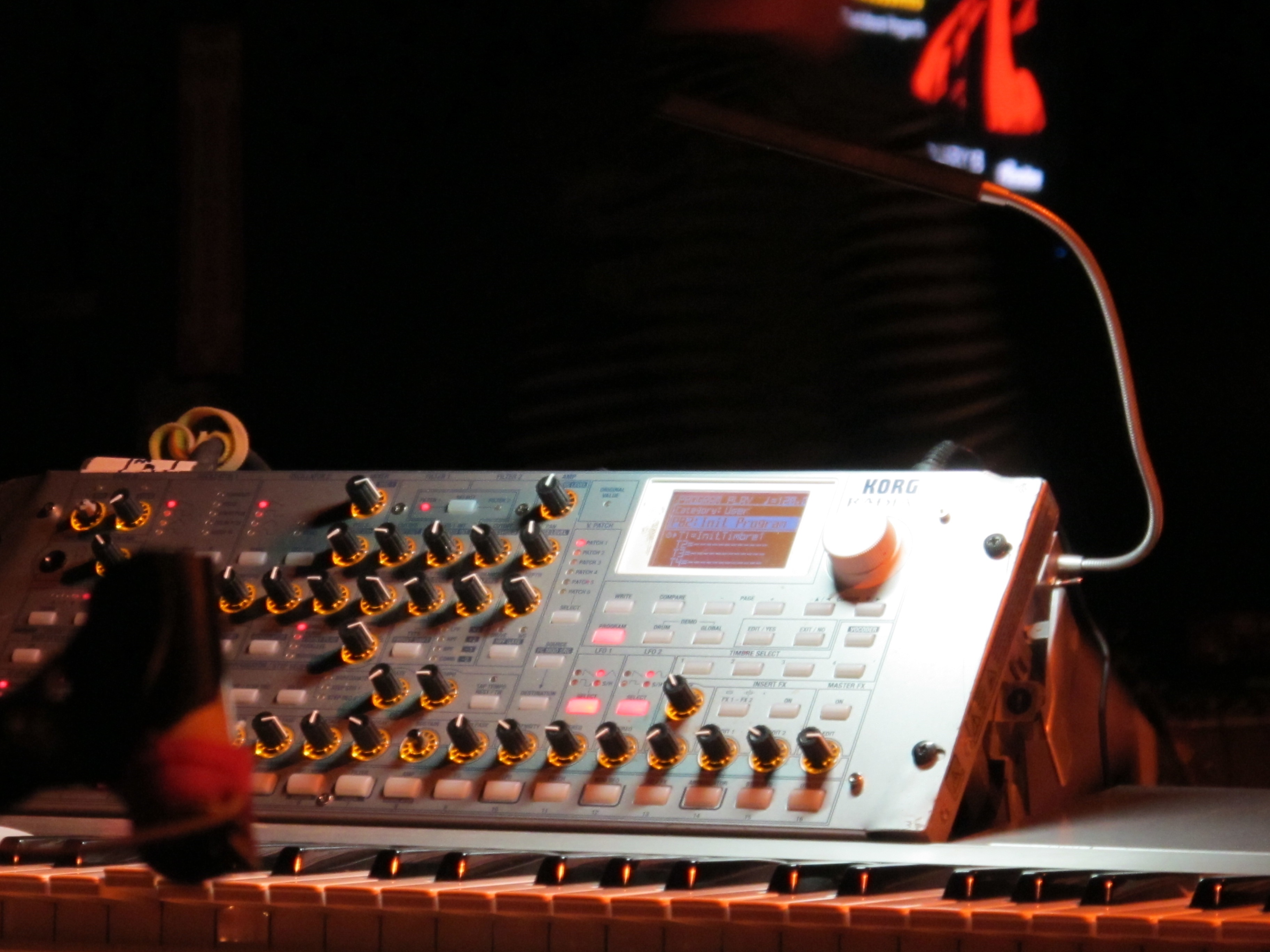
- Manufacturer: Korg
- Dates: 2006
- Price: $1999 US (with keyboard) $1499 US (module only)

Technical specifications
- Polyphony: 24 voices
- Oscillator: 2 oscillators, 1 noise generator, 2 filters, 1 wave shaper, 3 envelope generators, 2 LFOs, 6 virtual patches
- LFO: 2
- Filter: Filter 1: -24 dB Low Pass, -12 dB Low Pass, High Pass, Band Pass, Thru modes Filter 2: Low Pass, High Pass, Band Pass, Comb modes
- Aftertouch expression: Partial support (in mono through MIDI, using a MIDI keyboard)
- Velocity expression: Yes
- Storage memory: 75
- Effects: 30 types

Input/output
- Left-hand control: 1 pedal jack, 1 switch jack, 1 keyboard jack, MIDI In, out, thru

The Korg RADIAS is a virtual analog synthesizer and Vocoder, released by Korg in 2006.

== Features ==
The RADIAS' MMT (Multiple Modelling Technology) engine was based on the Korg OASYS synthesizer module, providing for several different synthesis methods, two of which may be combined in a single voice e.g. phase distortion synthesis can be combined with subtractive synthesis. The different synthesis methods employed by MMT represent the majority of methods used historically in other Korg synthesizers: digital waveguide synthesis Korg first used in the Korg Z1 and phase distortion synthesis was first used in the Korg DS-8. This flexibility allows for very realistic emulations of past Korg synthesizers (both digital and analog), though stays away from trying to emulate the Korg M1 and the Korg Wavestation, (these synthesizers used Pulse-code modulation, Sample-based synthesis and Wave sequencing/vector synthesis respectively, something that MMT does not emulate). As well as using the in-built waveforms (digital & analog emulations) for the basis of sound creation, the RADIAS allows for the input of an external signal which may be routed through the various sound shaping devices (filters / pitch envelopes etc.). The RADIAS has a comprehensive matrix modulation specification and to further enhance a sound the 'Wave Shaper' module allows for various sound distortion effects. A 16-band vocoder with Formant Shift function is also available.

RADIAS also takes advantage of KKS Korg Komponent System which allows the user to detach the RADIAS-R module from the dedicated RADIAS-KB keyboard. The RADIAS-R module could be bought separately but the keyboard can not. The RADIAS-R module can be installed on the M3-73 or M3-88 and played simultaneously with the Korg M3 module using the M3's keyboard.

Using SuperSaw waveforms and Unison mode, the RADIAS has the ability to stack up to five waveforms in one oscillator, using only one voice of polyphony. Also, there is an additional unison mode, which can stack five waveforms, but uses additional voices. These modes can be used in conjunction with each other. Doing allows the user to create up to 25 "Super waveforms" (SuperSaws, but also super triangles, sines and squares).

All these functions with 24-voice capability are accomplished on two TMS320VC5502 DSP chips from Texas Instruments. Each DSP chip has up to 600 Millions Multiply-Accumulates Per Second with 16bit fixed point. Which is not to be confused with the audio interface that is a 24 bit processor.

In 2007, Korg released a slimmed down, three octave version of the Radias synthesizer with fewer features called the R3.

A dual filter, which not only allows you to use two filters in various configurations for each timbre, but also to "morph" different filter types. Formant Motion Record allows recording spoken phrases and then trigger them with the keyboard using Vocoder function. A Modulation Sequencer, a "virtual analog sequencer" that mimics analog sequencing, 3 * 16 step. Virtual Patching, originally developed on the Korg MS2000, six "virtual patches" allow any of 15 modulation sources to be routed to any of 15 modulateable parameters.

== Notable users ==
- J.R. Rotem
- Sandy Vee
- Ferry Corsten
- Tangerine Dream
