= Access Virus =

Line of synthesizers

Virus A series

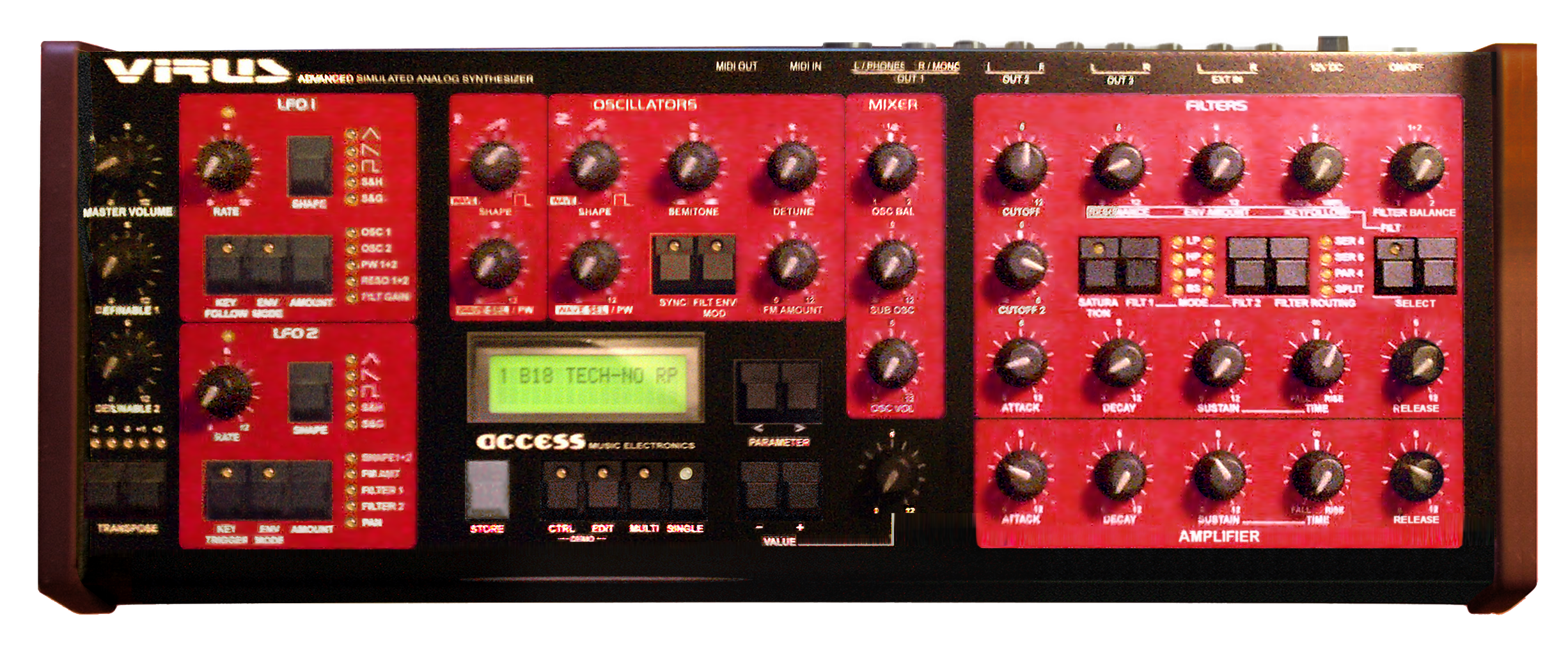
Virus A

Virus B series

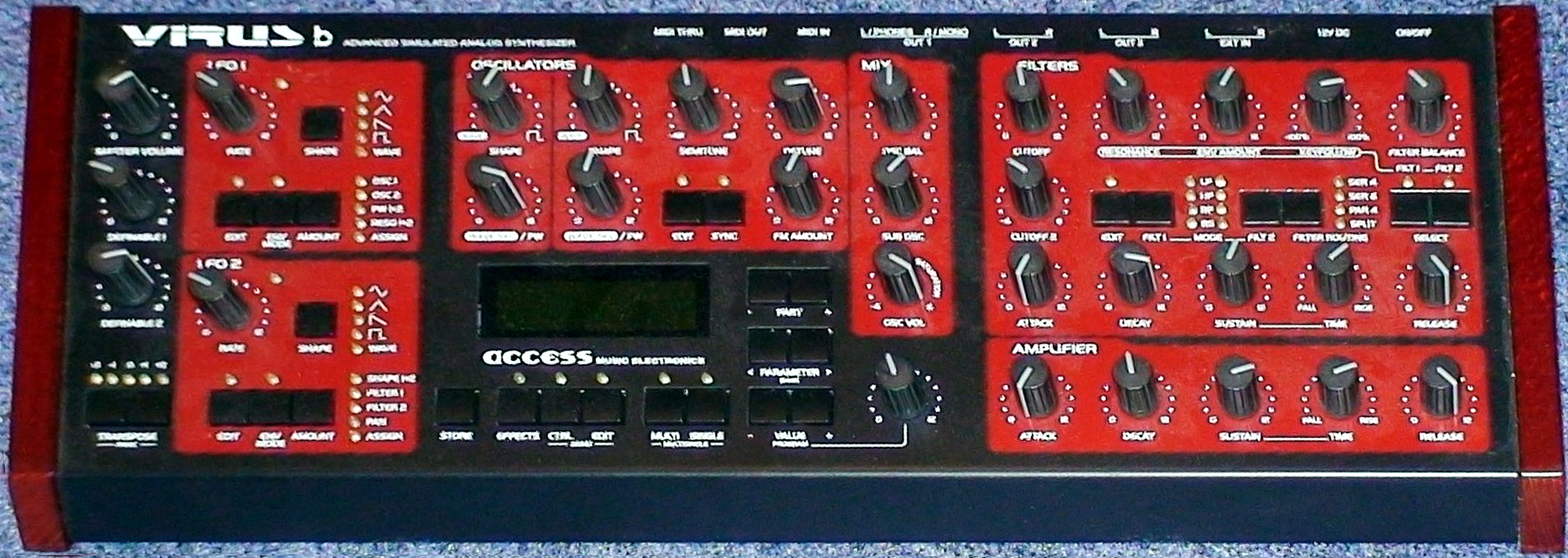
Virus B

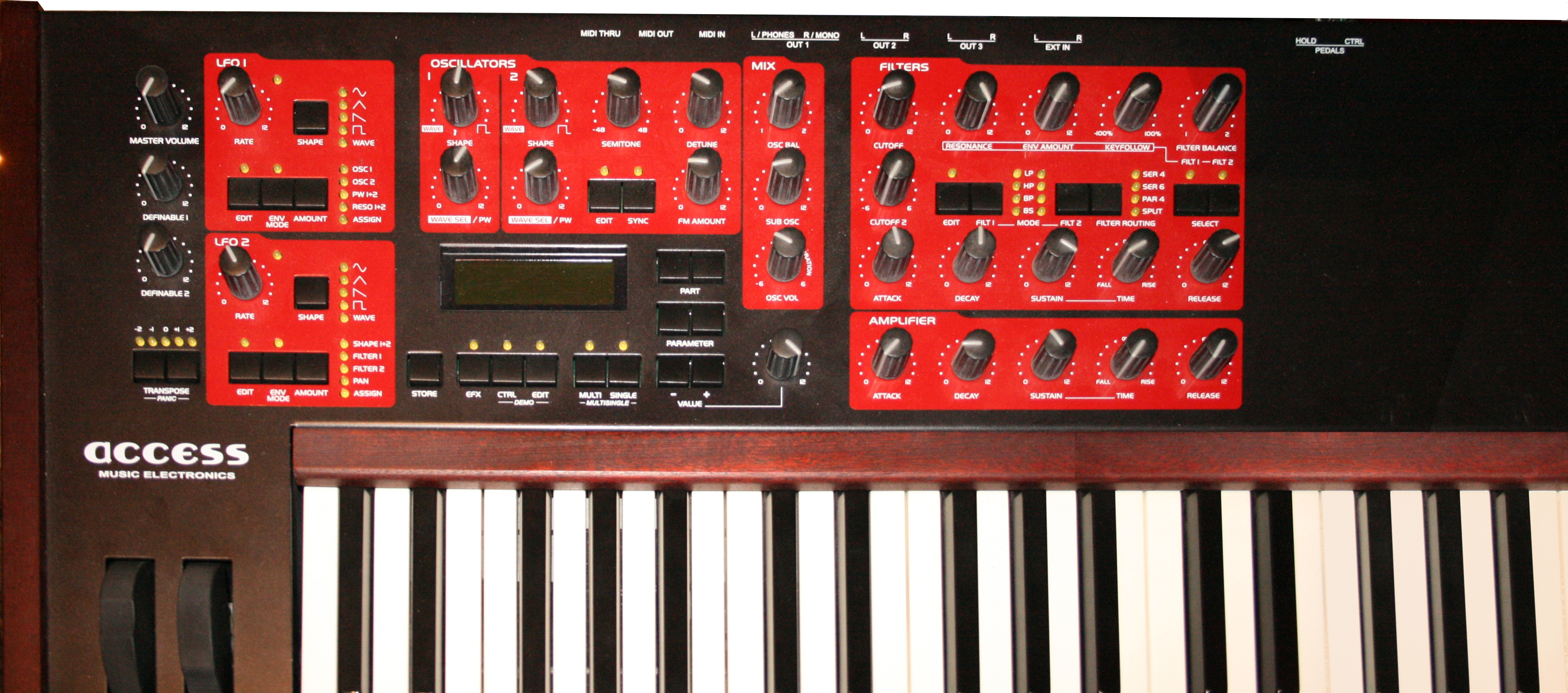
Virus KB

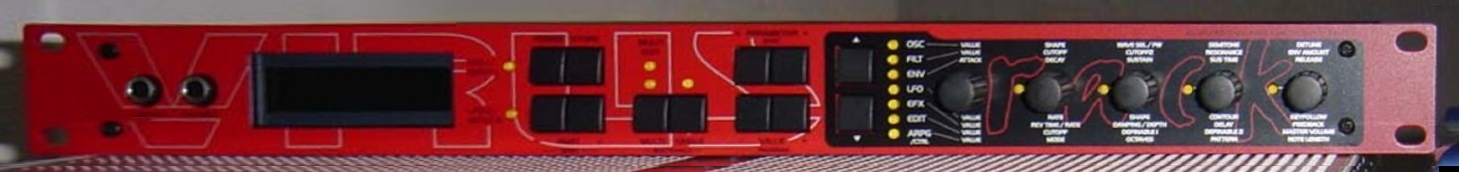
Virus Rack

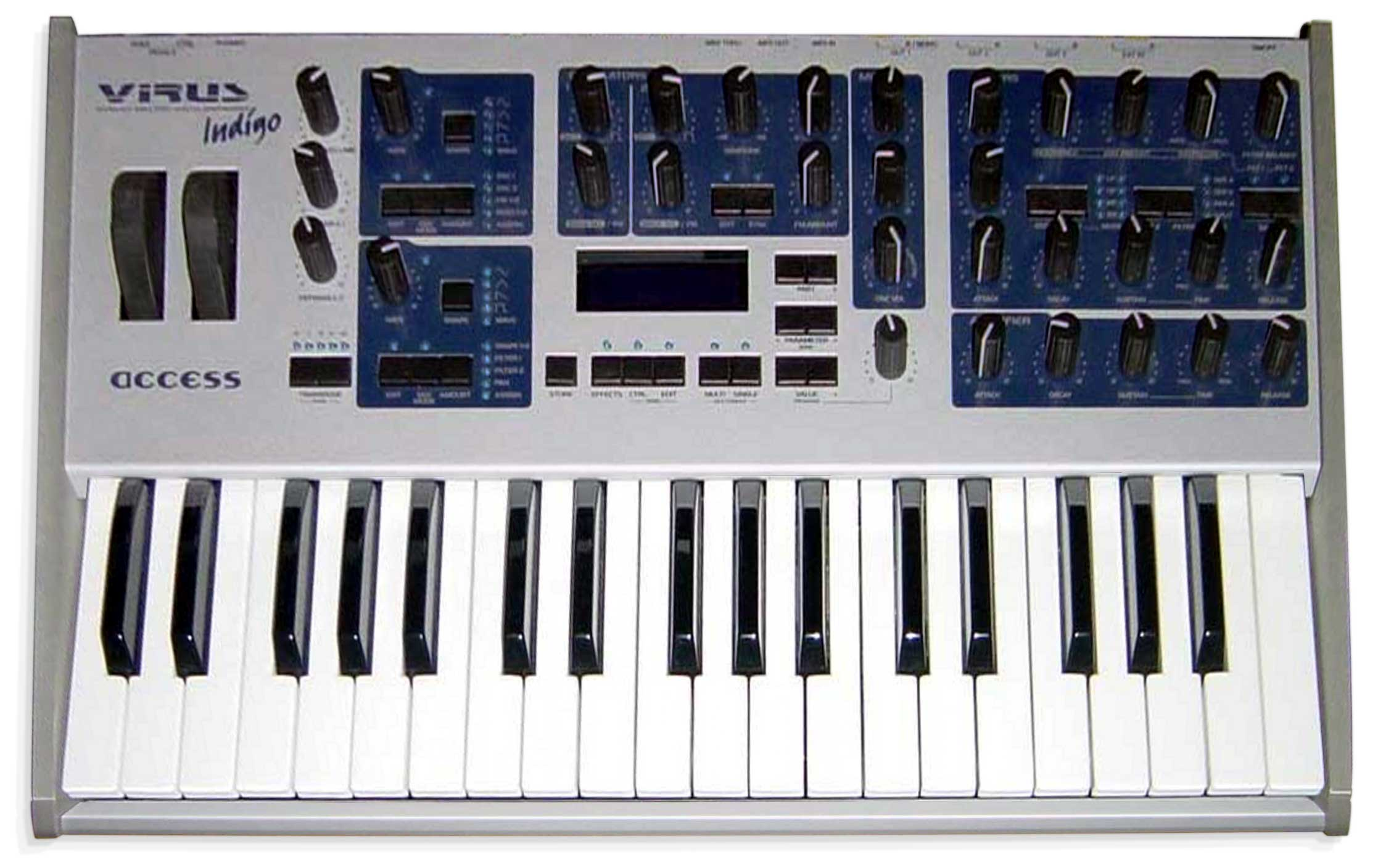
Virus Indigo

Virus C series

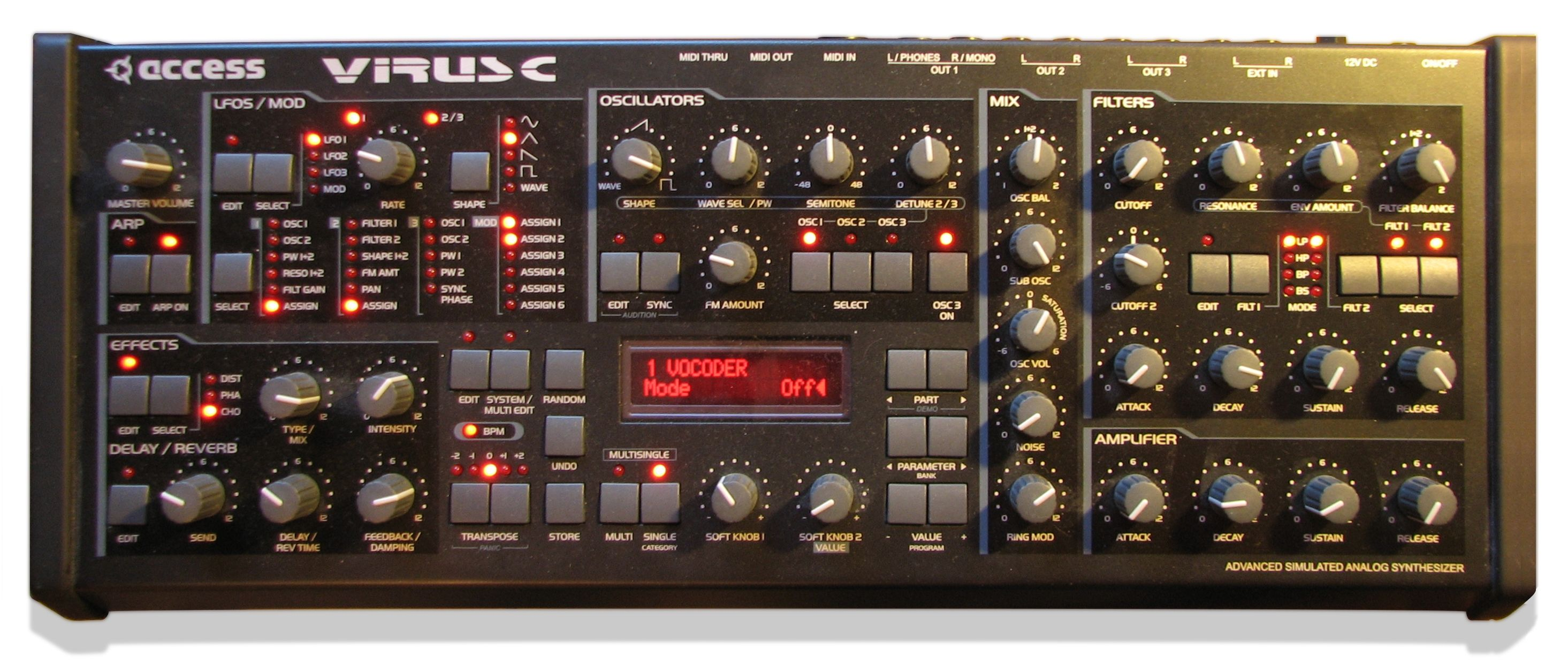
Virus C

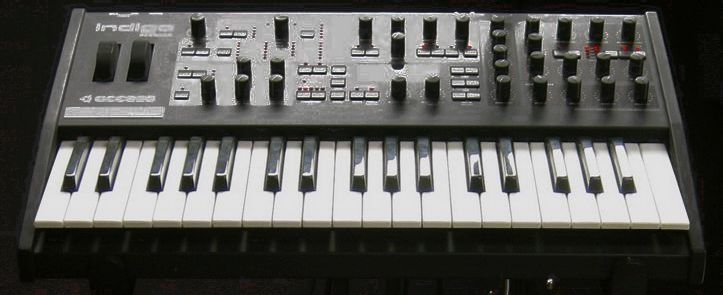
Virus Indigo2 Redback

Virus TI / TI2 series

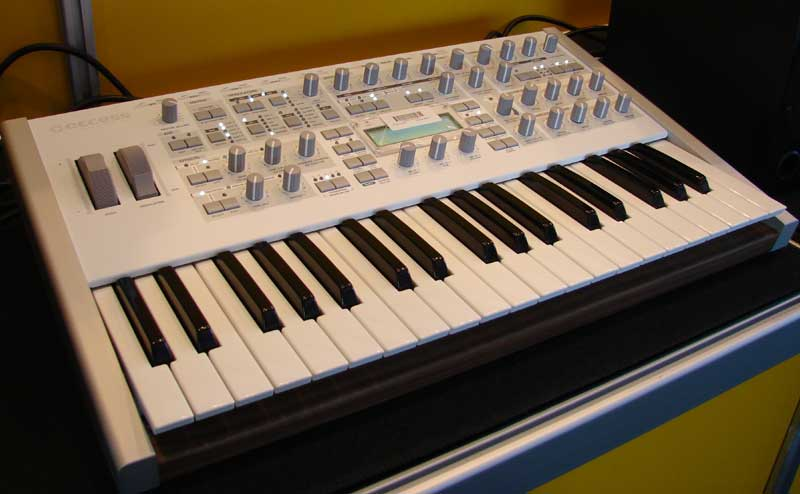
Virus TI Polar

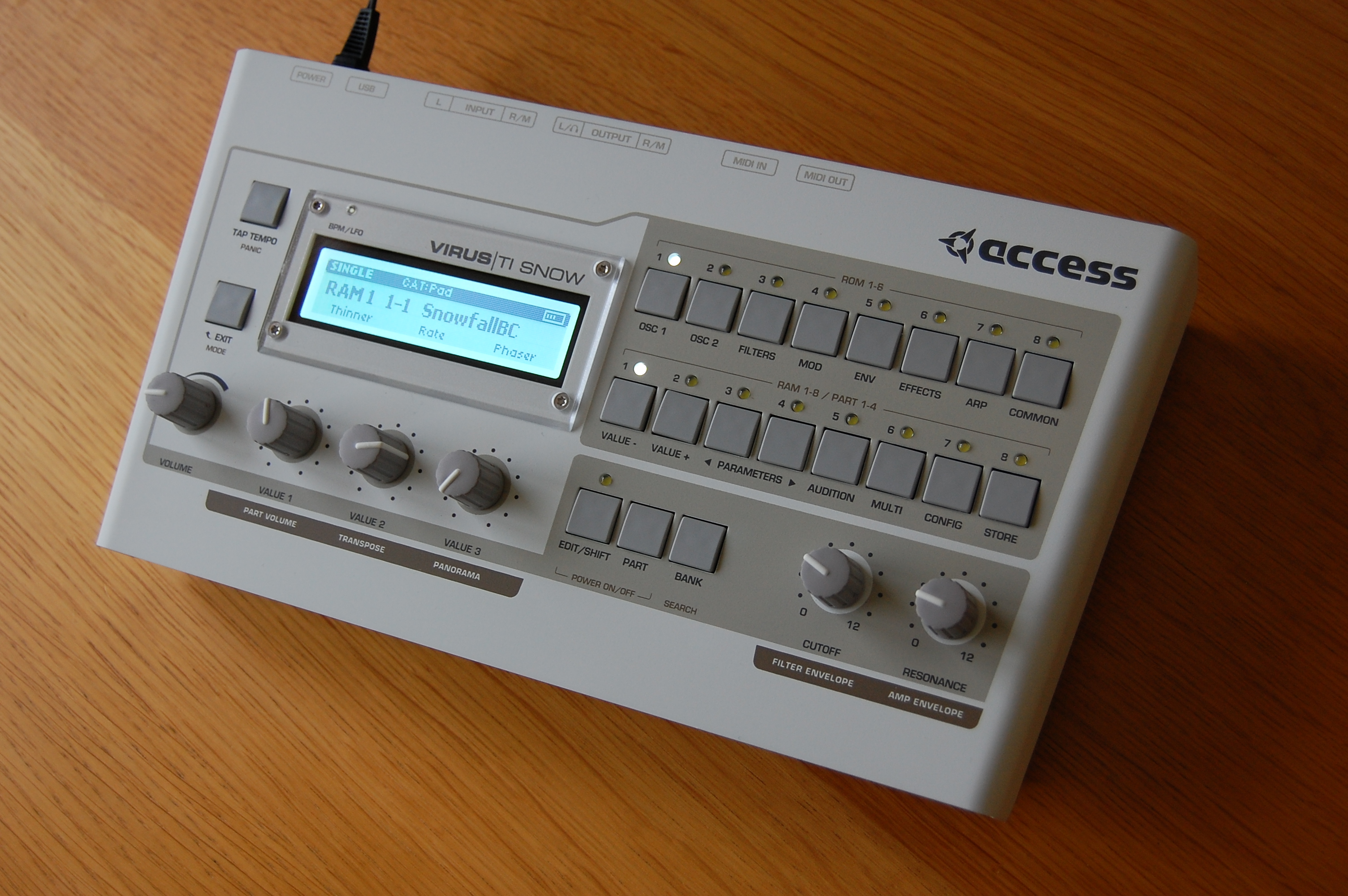
Virus TI Snow

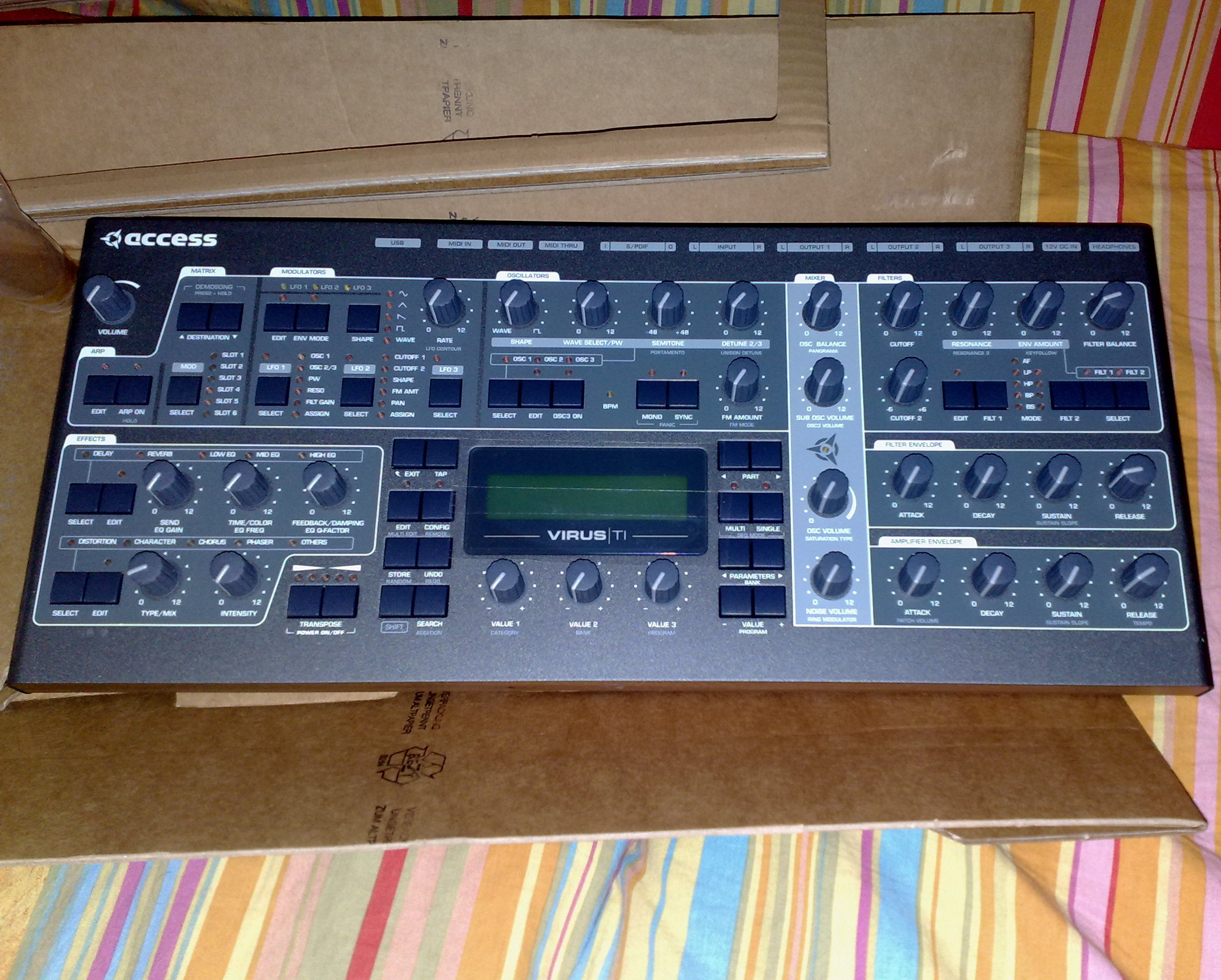
Virus TI 2 Desktop

The Access Virus is a series of virtual analog synthesizer made by the German company Access Music GmbH. It was first produced in 1997 and has since been upgraded frequently.

== History ==
Access initially built hardware controllers for the Oberheim Matrix-1000 and the Waldorf Microwave synthesizers, released under the company name Access MIDI Tools.

When the Nord Lead was released in 1995, Christoph Kemper was inspired to build his own virtual synthesizer. He teamed up with Guido Kirsch, the founder of Access. The first model, Virus A, was unveiled at the Musikmesse Frankfurt in 1997.

Guido Kirsch left Access in 2007 to start Neo Instruments, with Christoph Kemper remaining.

== Models ==
=== Virus A ===
Virus A, the first edition of the Access Virus, was unveiled in February 1997 at the Musikmesse Frankfurt. It was released in 1997 and sold 300 units that year.

A pre-production model was reviewed by Sound on Sound in the UK for their November 1997 issue, with positive reception.

=== Virus B ===
The Virus B followed in 1999 with improved converters and expanded polyphony, It is a desktop (rackable) module without a keyboard. A version with a keyboard was released as the Virus KB (Keyboard B)

The Virus Indigo and Virus Rack were later released. These used slightly different synthesis engines to the Virus B.

=== Virus C ===
The Virus C was released in 2002 with further expanded polyphony and additional synthesis features.

Further variants under the Virus C line were released the same year, with the Virus KC (Keyboard C), Virus Indigo 2, and Virus Rack XL, all sharing the same synthesis engine. A limited edition cosmetic upgrade of the Virus Indigo 2 was released as the Virus Indigo 2 Redback.

=== Virus TI ===
In November 2005, the Virus TI series was released, including the 61-key Virus TI Keyboard and the 37-key Virus TI Polar. A small desktop model was released in February 2008 called the Virus TI Snow.

=== Virus TI2 ===
A revision of the TI series called TI2 came out in March 2009, featuring faster digital signal processing (DSP) controllers, additional polyphony, more effects in the effect section and a slightly changed design.

Christoph Kemper confirmed in February 2024 that production of the TI2 had been discontinued a few months earlier.

=== Software plugin versions ===
The Virus series also has come out with two software plugin versions: TDM for Pro Tools and VST for TC Electronic Powercore series.

== Technical details ==
The Access Virus employs various synthesis techniques, including subtractive synthesis, phase distortion (PD) synthesis, frequency modulation (FM) synthesis, and starting with the TI series, wavetable synthesis.

All of the Viruses are DSP-powered, virtual analog synthesizers. They have virtual VCOs which can be tuned continuously from a pure sine wave to a square wave (with variable pulse-width modulation), as well as 63 "spectral" waveforms which are entirely synthetic, non-analog style waves. Oscillator waveforms may be modulated in a number of ways: ring modulation (AM), phase distortion (PD), or Frequency Modulation (FM). The Virus has a Matrix Modulation specification. With the TI series, several new oscillator models were added: Hypersaw and wavetable, as well as formant and granular oscillators.

The filter section is programmable, with two independent resonant filters which can be combined and modulated in various ways. The Matrix Modulation specification allows for the creation of complex and detailed sounds. The Virus features a filter saturation stage as well as different types of digital and analog-style distortion.

== Series comparisons ==
The Virus has had three major hardware revisions since the original Virus A model as well as having numerous features (both minor and major) added via firmware operating system updates. The Virus engine largely remained the same from the Virus A up until the Virus C. They all utilize a single Motorola DSP chip and the sound is quite distinct between models when not factoring in the additional features provided by each hardware and firmware upgrade. The biggest effect of software optimisation is seen as a third oscillator control in the B-series menus.

The Virus TI utilizes two DSP chips and represented the most significant technical overhaul of the Virus series since its inception.

The Virus TI series allows for a very wide emulation of past and present synthesizers. It is a digital synthesizer but can emulate the characteristic sound and behaviour of analogue synthesizers whilst also retaining some digital features. What separates the Virus's VA module from other analogue modelling synths in its price range is its twin multimode filter design and extensive modulation matrix. As of the Virus B OS4 update, it has three oscillators per voice (+1 sub oscillator per voice) with two filters per voice.

The basic Virus analogue modeled oscillators between the Virus A and TI are identical with the only difference being the number of voices available as well as the additional Hypersaw oscillator and digital wavetable oscillators of the Virus TI. Additionally, the raw Virus oscillators have much less high frequency content than the oscillators found on other subtractive virtual analogues such as the Clavia Nord Lead and Roland JP-8000.

The highly resonant twin multimode filter is also an important aspect of the Virus sound, the features of which have been extended in the Ti range to include grain table, comb and formant filter settings.

Both Virus filters can be connected in series, parallel or set to process two oscillators independently. The routable nature of the filter allows the Virus to emulate an 18 dB/octave 3-pole filter for instance, by routing a 24 dB/octave 4-pole filter in series with a 12 dB/octave 2-pole filter, then turning the filter balance to 3 or 9 o'clock. Connecting a 4-pole filter in series with a 2-pole filter also allows for a 36 dB/octave 6-pole filter configuration, which is unique amongst similarly priced virtual analogues. The interchangeable filters allow for such things as simultaneous high pass and low pass sweeps and filter modulation effects such as automated filter sweeps whilst still leaving a filter free for manual use.

Every parameter on the control surface of the synth and every parameter in every sub menu can be set as a modulation destination. The Virus also has a list of modulation sources, including a random trigger. There are three modulation sources on the Virus A and B, which can be set to control six destinations. The Virus C and TI both allow for six modulation sources controlling a possible 18 modulation destinations. This does not include the three LFOs which can be set to modulate oscillators 1 and 2, pulse width, resonance and cutoff of both filters, stereo pan and any parameter set as a source in the modulation matrix, simultaneously if desired.

It is possible to emulate the unstable tuning of analogue synthesizers by setting a random source to modulate the pitch and detune of one or more oscillators, so that every time a note is played, its tuning will be very subtly different. The modulation matrix also allows for recursive modulation - setting a variable to modulate itself. This plays an important role in altering the behaviour of many of the control variables on the synth. For example, the Virus amplifier attack envelope is linear by default but can be changed via setting the amplifier envelope as a modulation source that modulates itself as its destination.

The Virus also has a complement of DSP effects, including a distortion unit that allows for rectification, analogue modelled and digital distortion, as well as bit-reducing and sample rate-reducing effects. The Virus C and TI also includes a 3-band EQ.

Lastly, the Virus has always been 16 parts multitimbral for multilayered patches and ensemble performances. However, up until the Virus TI, this aspect of the Virus has been severely flawed and is often considered unusable because of the polyphonic limitations of the Virus A, B and C.

The programming methodology for a Virus A is largely the same as that of a Virus TI and so are the bulk of the sounds produced. However, the additional oscillators, higher polyphony, extra filter type, the EQ and revised control surface and sequencer integration of the TI allow for a greater palette of possible sounds over previous revisions. There were hardware alterations made to the TI such as the balanced inputs/outputs, 24 bit/96 kHz output and the new sequencer integrated interface.

The Virus TI Snow was unveiled at the NAMM Show in January 2008. It is a stripped-down version of the TI Desktop and is patch compatible with the rest of the TI line. It is much smaller, sporting a minimalist interface and utilizes a single DSP chip, giving it about half the polyphony and only four parts of multitimbral capability.

== Notable users ==
The Access Virus has been used extensively by trance and techno artists, including Headhunterz, Hardwell, Angerfist, Luca Anzilotti a.k.a. John VIRGO Garrett III of Snap!, Paul Oakenfold, DJ Sammy and Sasha. Anders Trentemøller mentioned Access Virus as one of two synths he used while creating his first album "The Last Resort". It has also been used by Minecraft composer Daniel Rosenfeld.

The synthesizer has been utilized in a broad range of genres by artists such as Celine Dion, Depeche Mode, Dr. Dre, Front Line Assembly, Gary Numan, OMD, Jean-Michel Jarre, Linkin Park, Michael Jackson, Nine Inch Nails, No Doubt, Radiohead, Stevie Wonder, t.A.T.u, The Prodigy, Thomas Dolby, TOOL, VNV Nation, and film composers Hans Zimmer and Klaus Badelt.
