= Korg MS2000 =

Synthesizer released in 2000

MS2000
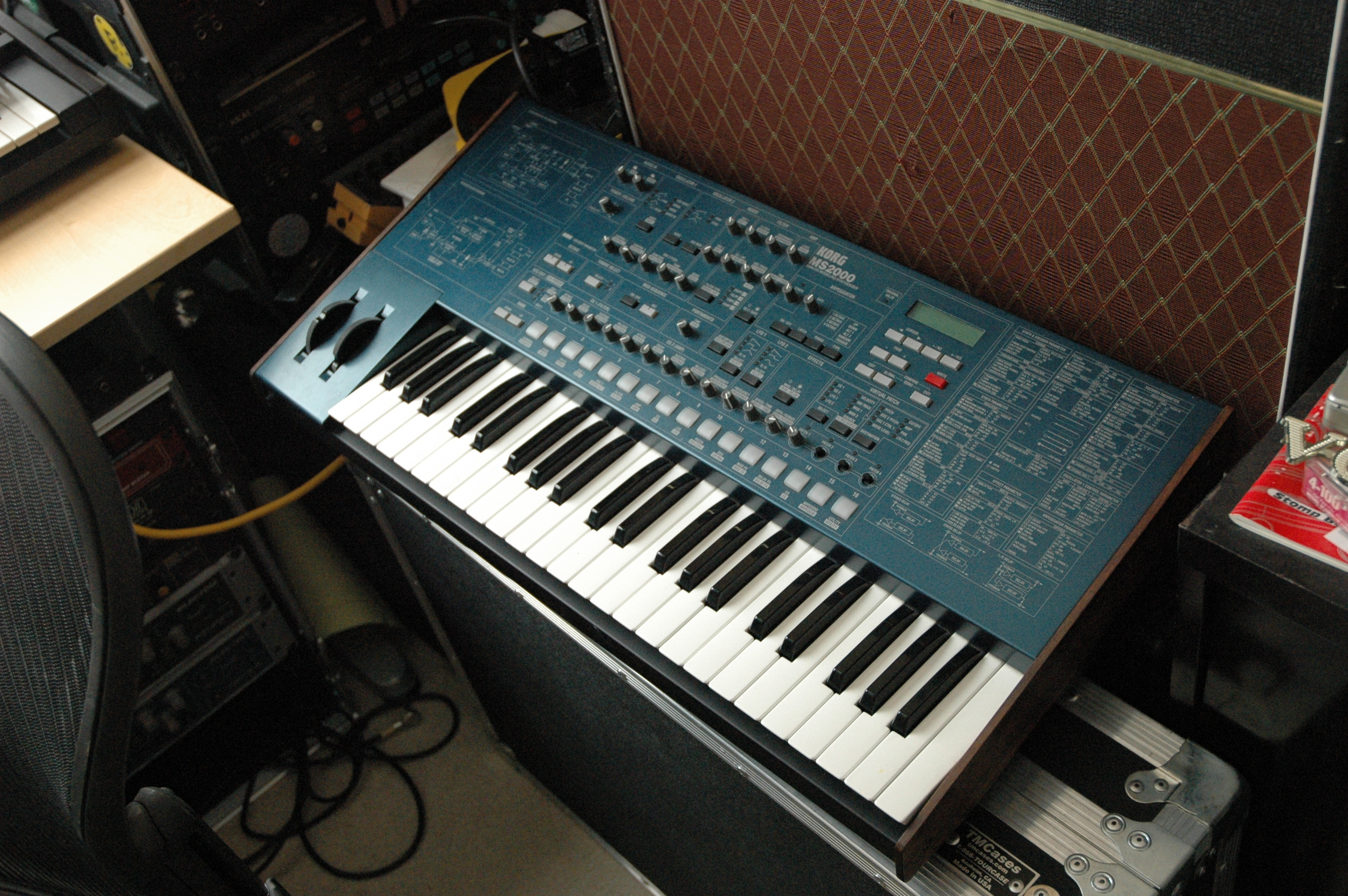
- Korg MS2000
- Manufacturer: Korg
- Dates: 2000 - 2004

Technical specifications
- Polyphony: 4 voices
- Timbrality: 2
- Oscillator: 2 (or 4) oscillators per voice
- LFO: 2
- Synthesis type: Virtual analog Subtractive
- Filter: 1 resonant lowpass/highpass/bandpass
- Attenuator: 2 ADSR
- Aftertouch expression: Yes (set to MIDI1 or MIDI2 and assign target parameter via Virtual Patch bay)
- Velocity expression: Yes
- Storage memory: 128 patches
- Effects: Chorus, delay, EQ, flanger, phaser, ring modulator, vocoder

Input/output
- Keyboard: 44 keys
- External control: MIDI

The Korg MS2000 is a virtual analog synthesizer produced by the Japanese electronic musical instrument manufacturer Korg.

== History and features ==
The synthesizer was offered as either a 44-key board or as a rack module, the latter being controlled by an external keyboard controller, hardware sequencer or a computer, making use of the MIDI implementation. It was intended to bring the sound and basic functionality of the MS-10 and MS-20 back into the keyboard market, but with the updated technology of Virtual Analog Synthesis. The onboard knobs and buttons could be used to dynamically edit many of the parameters while playing, as well as be used as a control surface for other synthesizers and sound modules.

At the time of the release of the MS2000, Korg was competing directly with synthesizers such as the Clavia Nord Lead and Roland's JP-8000 and JP-8080. While both of these VA machines were powerful in their own right, they were expensive. Korg had to make some sacrifices to be able to offer the much simpler MS2000 at a more reasonable price. The most prominent limitation was the synthesizer's polyphony of only 4 voices. If one connected the rack and keyboard together via the MIDI ports, the two devices could be set to produce notes offset to one another, turning the combined system into an 8-voice synthesizer.

== Synthesis ==
The MS2000 has several voice modes; in single voice mode, only timbre 1 will sound. If the voice mode is Dual or Split, both timbres 1and 2 will sound. Oscillator 1 allows the user to select from eight different oscillator algorithms, including basic analog synthesizer waveforms such as SAW and PWM, Cross Modulation, a Noise Generator, and Korg's proprietary DWGS (Digital Waveform Generator System) originally developed for the Korg DW-8000 synthesizer. An external signal such as a mic, instrument or line input from the AUDIO IN 1/2 jacks can also be processed.

OSC2 (Oscillator 2) allows one to select from three types: SAW, SQUARE, and TRI. It can also be used as an oscillator for Ring Modulation or Sync, which are available as modulation destinations to generate sweep and vintage lead sounds.

The FILTER cuts or emphasizes frequency components of the signal from the oscillator, affecting tone and brightness. Three primary types of filtering are available: –12 or –24 dB/oct LPF (Low Pass Filter), –12 dB/oct BPF (Band Pass Filter), or –12 dB/oct HPF (High Pass Filter). Using EG1 to create time-variant changes in cutoff frequency adds a fourth type of filtering.

The AMP stage consists of AMP (Amplifier), DIST (Distortion), and PAN (Panpot). AMP sets the volume, and PAN sets the sound's location in the stereo field. Using EG2 can create time-variant changes in volume. Quite harsh tones can be created by turning DIST on, and adjusting the filter cutoff and resonance, higher-pitched rings and tonalities are created with various harmonics layered on.

The Envelope Generator applies a time-variant change to each timbre parameter. On the MS2000/MS2000R, there are two standard ADSR envelope generators for each timbre. EG1 is assigned as the envelope source that produces time variant changes in the FILTER cutoff frequency, while EG2 is assigned as the envelope source that produces time variant changes in the AMP volume. The MS2000's VIRTUAL PATCH module can be used to assign EG1 and EG2 to other parameters.

The LFO (Low Frequency Oscillator) applies cyclic change to sound parameters. The MS2000/MS2000R provides two LFO's for each timbre, each with four waveforms. LFO1 is assigned as the modulation source for OSC1. LFO2 is assigned as the modulation source for the pitch modulation controlled by the modulation wheel. As with the EG's, VIRTUAL PATCH can be used to assign LFO1 and LFO2 to other parameters.

Virtual patch allows the use of not only EG or LFO, but even keyboard velocity (keyboard playing dynamics) or keyboard tracking (the area of the keyboard that is played) as modulation sources which can be assigned to sound parameters for greater freedom in timbre editing and sound creating. Four routings (combinations) can be specified for each timbre.

Mod sequence is a step sequencer that lets you apply time-variant change to various sound parameters in a way similar to analog synthesizers of the past. The sixteen knobs on the main panel can be used to set the value of each step and then the sequence is played back. The sound can be further modulated by the arpeggiator and by VIRTUAL PATCH. The knobs can also be operated in realtime, and their movements (parameter values) recorded in each step (Motion Rec function). Since each timbre can have up to three sequences, very complex tonal changes can be obtained.

Each program can have a modulation effect, chorus, stereo delay, and equalization. For a modulation-type effect, select from chorus or stereo delay.

The onboard arpeggiator has six types of arpeggio. For a program whose voice mode is Dual/Split, arpeggios can be played on one or both timbres. Since arpeggiator settings can be made for each program, arpeggio types that are suitable for the sound of a particular timbre can be saved and played.

== Models ==
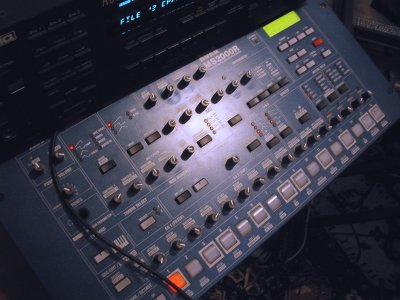
Korg MS2000R

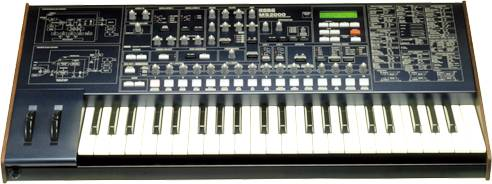
Korg MS2000B

The Korg MS2000R is the rack-mounted variant of the MS2000 synthesizer. In 2003, Korg introduced an updated version, the MS2000B, featuring minor enhancements, most notably the addition of a microphone input on the top of the keyboard, designed to simplify the use of the vocoder. A corresponding rack version, the MS2000BR, was released without the microphone or dedicated mic input; however, it retained full vocoder functionality through its audio inputs.
