= Quasimidi Rave-O-Lution 309 =

Synthesizer produced in 1996

- Manufacturer: Quasimidi
- Dates: 1996

Technical specifications
- Polyphony: 32 voices
- Timbrality: 5 parts
- LFO: Sample & Hold, Saw Up, Saw Down, Sine, Square
- Synthesis type: Sample-based synthesis; Physical modelling synthesis
- Filter: High Pass, Low Pass, Resonance
- Effects: Modulation, delay, reverb

Input/output
- Keyboard: 12 Pattern Pad keys
- External control: MIDI

The Quasimidi Rave-O-Lution 309 is a stand-alone groovebox produced by Quasimidi in 1996. It features an onboard sequencer and has the ability to mute parts during playback making this unit ideal for live performances. The machine features two oscillators for sound generation, (pulse, pulse variable, saw down, saw up, square, and triangle.)

== Sounds ==
The Rave-O-Lution 309 contains analogue, electronic drum and bass synth sounds.

== Sequencer ==
The unit features 100 preset and 100 user patterns.

== Effects ==
The effects included with this machine are:

- Modulation
- Delay
- Reverb

== Notable users ==
- Apollo 440
- Nine Inch Nails
- KMFDM
- Beastie Boys
