= Quasimidi Raven =

Synthesizer made in 1996

- Manufacturer: Quasimidi
- Dates: 1996

Technical specifications
- Polyphony: 24 Voices
- Timbrality: 16 Parts
- Oscillator: 3 osc MASS. (6 MB Samples-In-Memory)
- LFO: Yes, Sample & Hold, Saw Up, Saw Down, Square, Triangle
- Synthesis type: ROM, Subtractive
- Filter: 12dB Slope (2-pole), 24dB Slope (4-pole), High Pass, Low Pass, Resonance
- Aftertouch expression: Yes
- Velocity expression: Yes
- Storage memory: 512 patches, 100 performances
- Effects: 2 effects including reverb

Input/output
- Keyboard: 61 keys

The Quasimidi Raven was a German made synthesizer aimed at the dance music market. It also featured an 8-track sequencer, arpeggiators, real-time control knobs and effects. The Raven can be upgraded with the RavenMAX card. This increases the sample wave memory from 6 to 14 MB

== Patches ==
The unit features 512 patches. These include Basses, LeadSynths, SynthPads, Natural Sounds, Organs, FM-Percussion, Effects, Drumsets, Tuned Drums.
