= Casiotone =

Series of home electronic keyboards

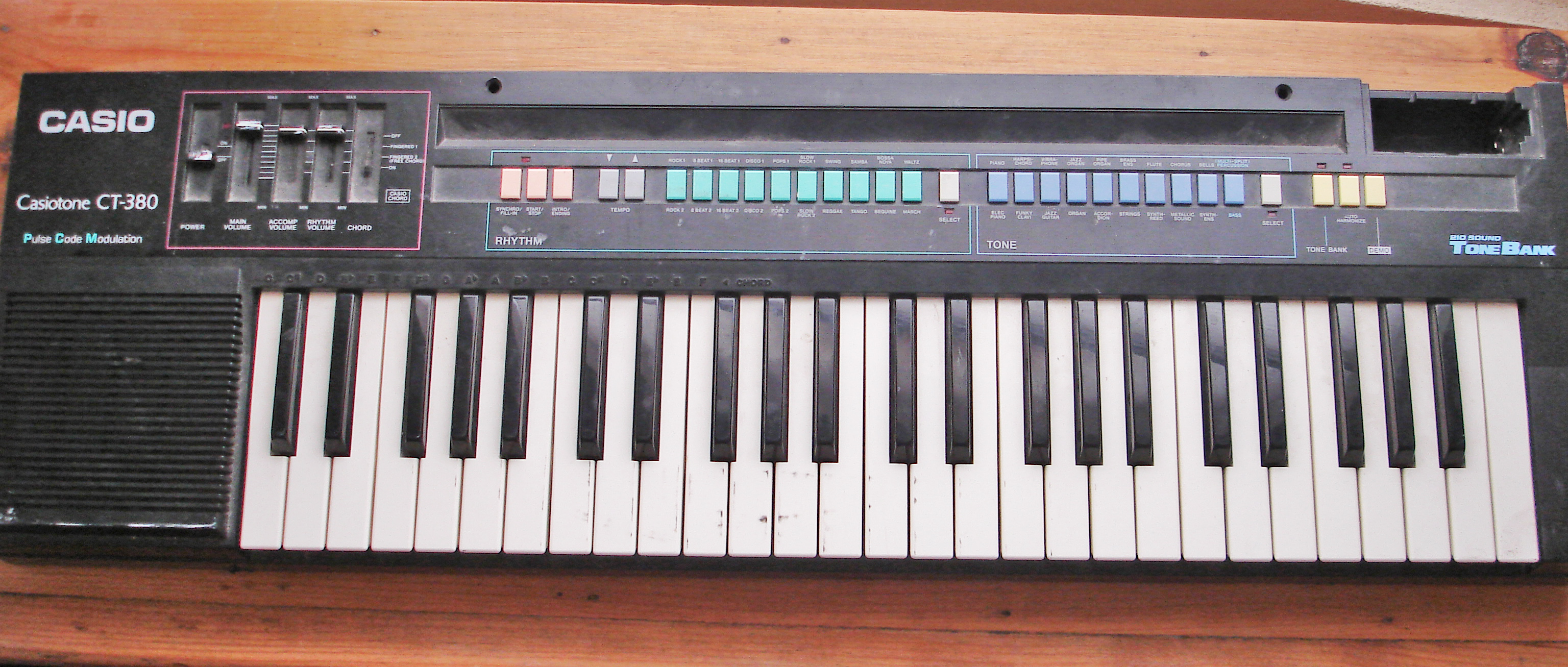
Casiotone CT-380 Keyboard

Casiotone was a series of home electronic keyboards made by Casio in the early 1980s. Casio promoted the Casiotone 201 (CT-201) as "the first electronic keyboard with full-size keys that anyone could afford". The name "Casiotone" disappeared from Casio's keyboard catalog when more accurate synthesis technologies became prevalent, but the brand was reused for new models launched in 2019. The instruments competed directly with the PortaSound/PortaTone series from Yamaha.

The first Casiotone keyboards used a sound synthesis technique known as vowel-consonant synthesis to approximate the sounds of other instruments (albeit not very accurately). Most Casiotone keyboards were small, with miniature keys designed for children's fingers, and were not intended for use by professional musicians; they usually contained a rhythm generator, with several user-selectable rhythm patterns, and often the means to automatically play accompaniments.

pre-Casiotone

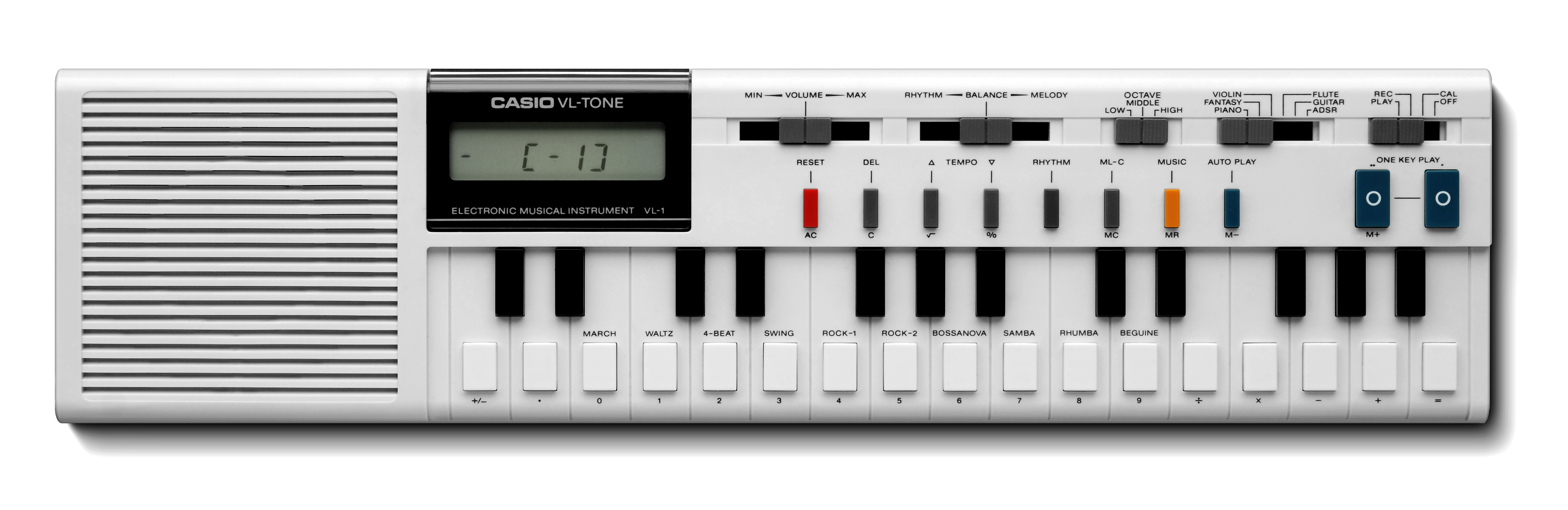
VL-Tone VL-1 (1981)

Casiotone

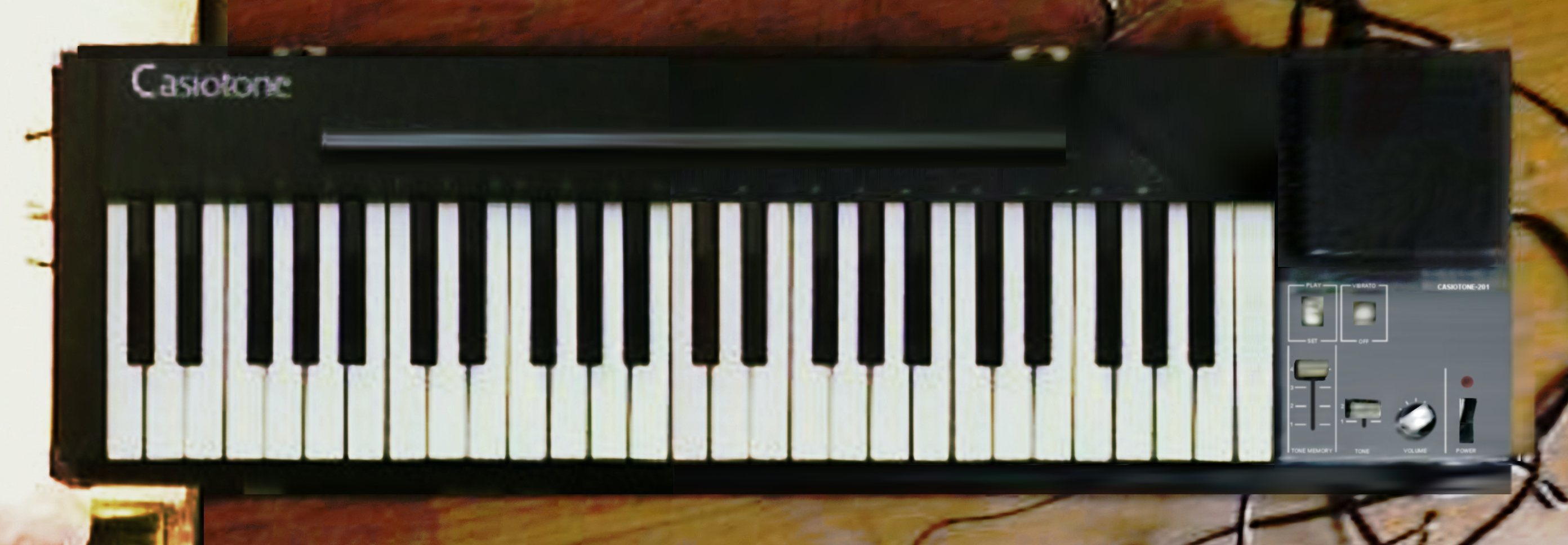
Casiotone 201 (1980, 1st Casiotone)

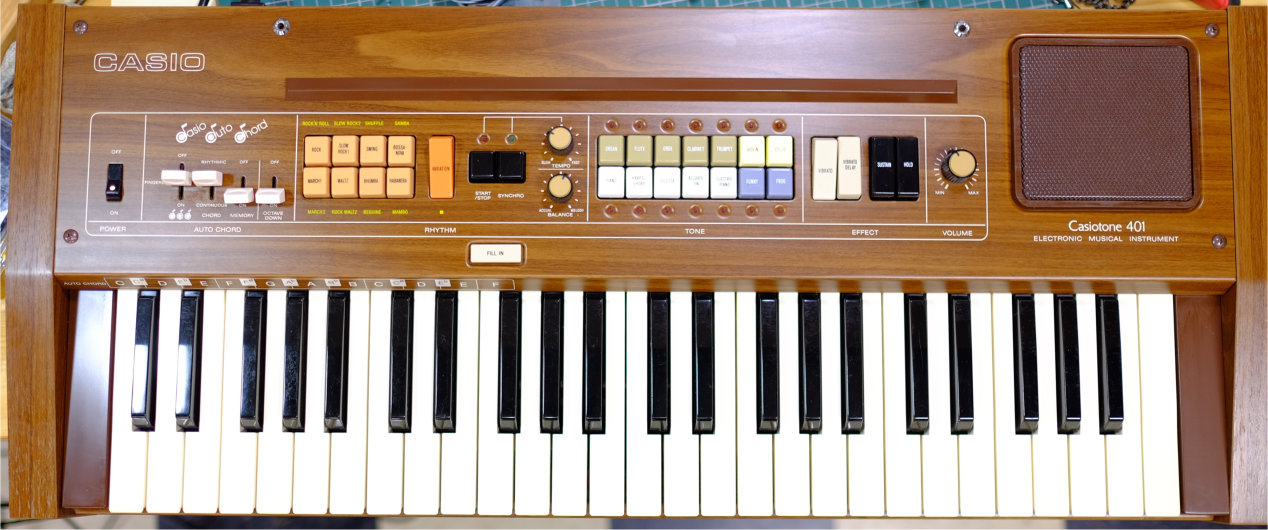
Casiotone 401 (1981, 1st Casiotone with polyphonic auto accompaniment)

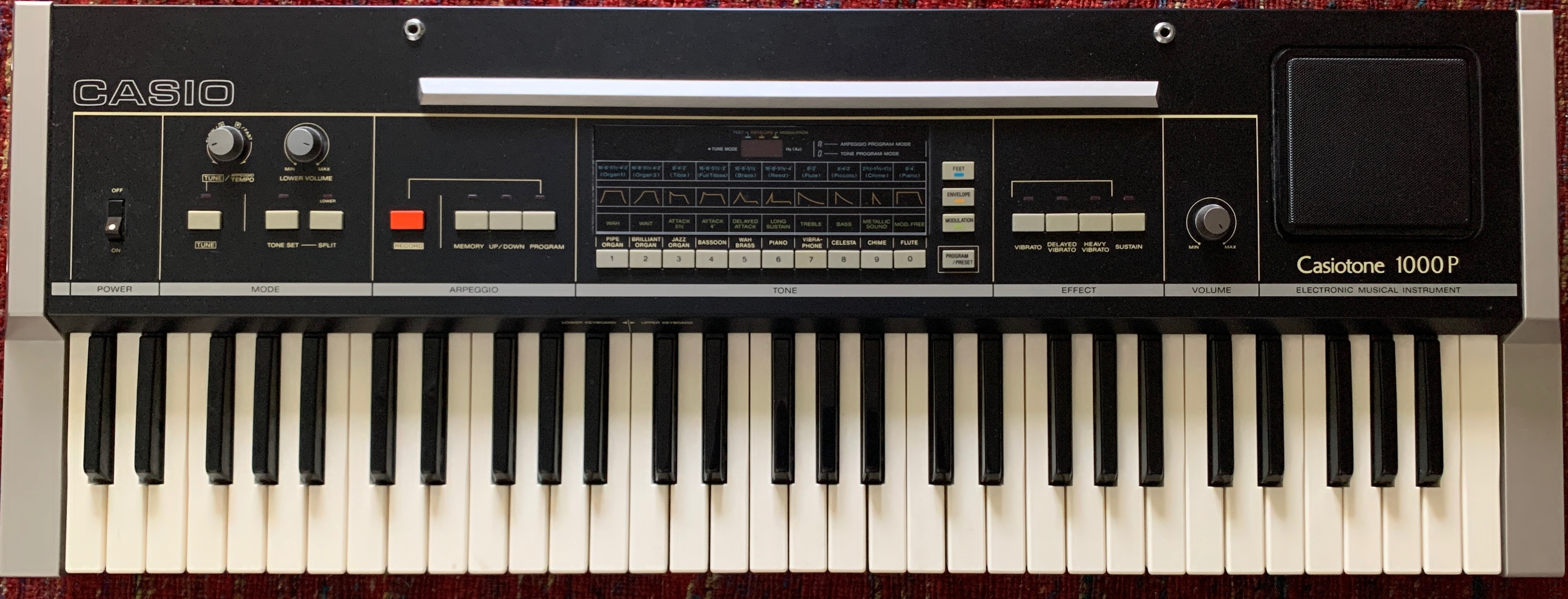
Casiotone 1000P (1982, semi-programmable synthesizer with arpeggiator)

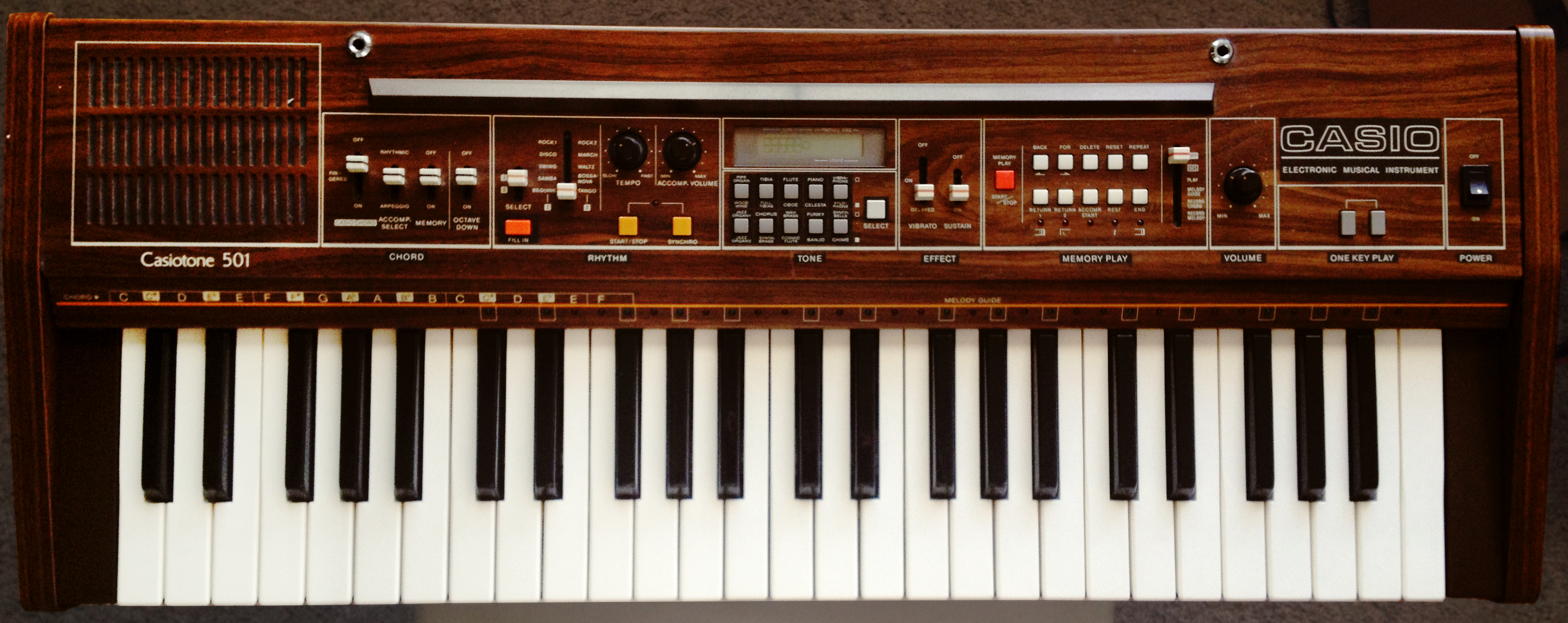
Casiotone 501 (1983, successor to CT-401)

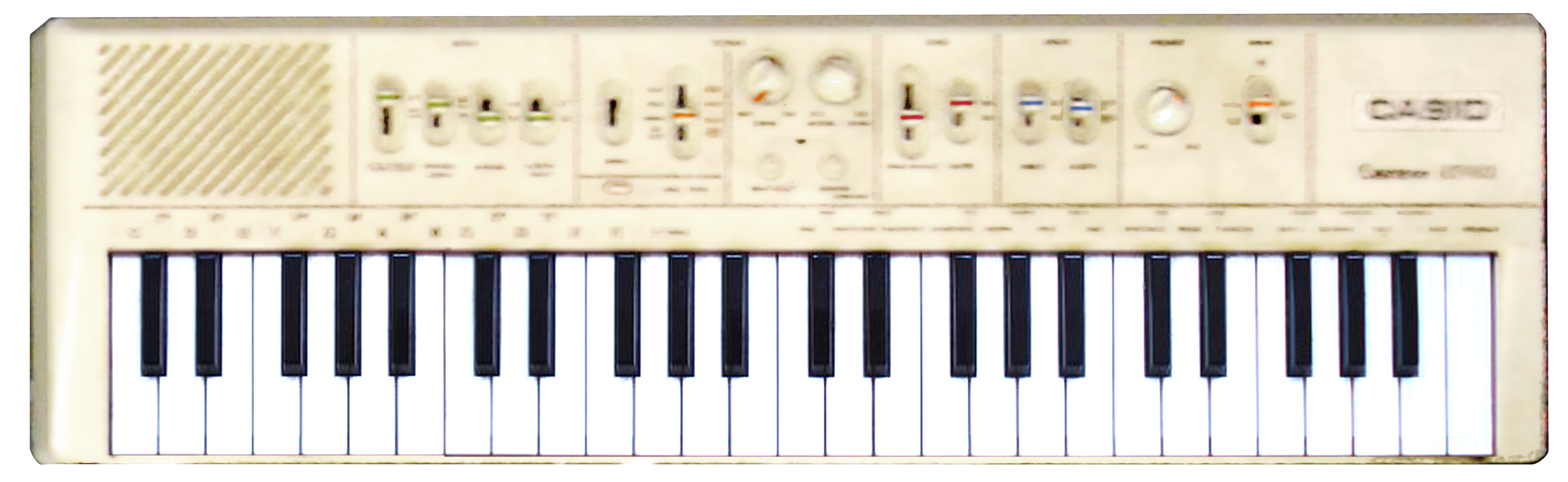
Casiotone MT-60 (identical case design with later MT-45)

post-Casiotone

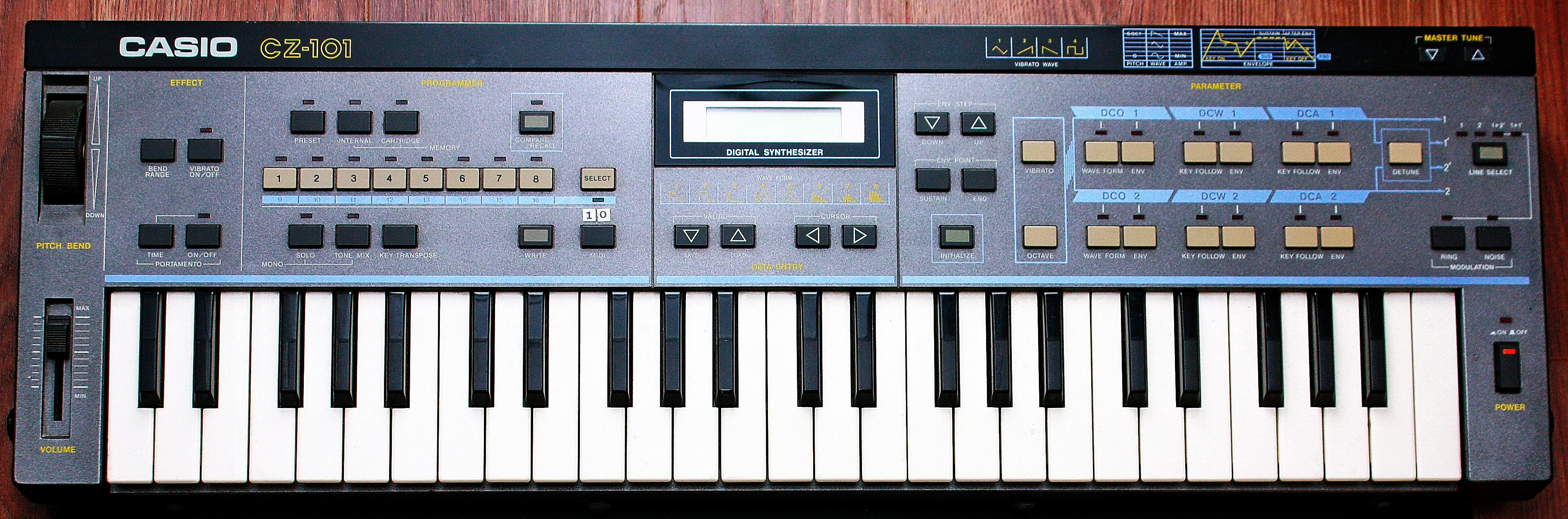
Casio CZ-101 (1984, phase distortion synthesis)

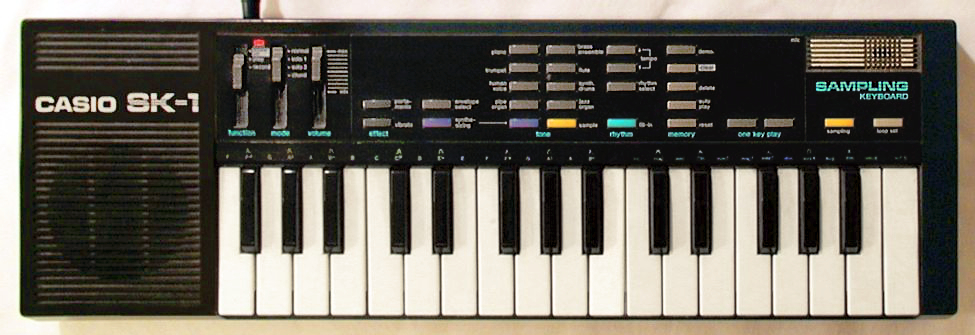
Sampletone SK-1 (1985, sampler)

== Families ==
The original Casiotone keyboards came in three distinct families, separated by the method of synthesis.

- The famous VL-Tone VL-1 (1981) uses a method of sound synthesis based on the Walsh function.
- Keyboards such as the CT-202 (c. 1981) use vowel-Consonant synthesis. The later model of this family, the MT-65, is one of the more well known and sought after models, as it also contains auto-accompaniment drum beats and bass lines.
- Some other keyboards (such as the MT-35 and MT-45) use a combination of two different binary weighted numbers (1 and 64). The larger weight bit provides the fundamental, and the smaller weight bit provides the harmonic complexity.

The later, more professional range of keyboards, the CZ series (1984–1986), used phase distortion synthesis, which is mathematically almost identical to Yamaha's frequency modulation synthesis, although implemented slightly differently in order to avoid patent infringement.

After the release of the Casio SK-1 in 1985, gradually PCM sample-based tone generators became dominant in Casio's keyboards line. After the 1990s, most Casio keyboards utilized PCM tone generator or its variants.

Some early 1980s models in the PT series of keyboards, such as the PT-30, PT-50, PT-80 and PT-82, were not marketed under the Casiotone name. The name was revived again later for models such as the PT-87 (which is basically the same as the PT-82) which was again sold as Casiotone.

== ROM packs ==
Some models sold from 1983 onwards included a cartridge bay to accept Casio ROM Packs which contained sheet music in a digital format. The keyboards could play the notes automatically, or (with the exception of the PT-50) illuminate LEDs above each key to teach the user how to play the song. Most keyboards came with one ROM Pack as standard, but a large number of additional packs, covering a wide range of musical genres, were available to purchase separately. The last ROM Pack model was the CT-840, which came out in 1990.

ROM Pack models (excerpt)

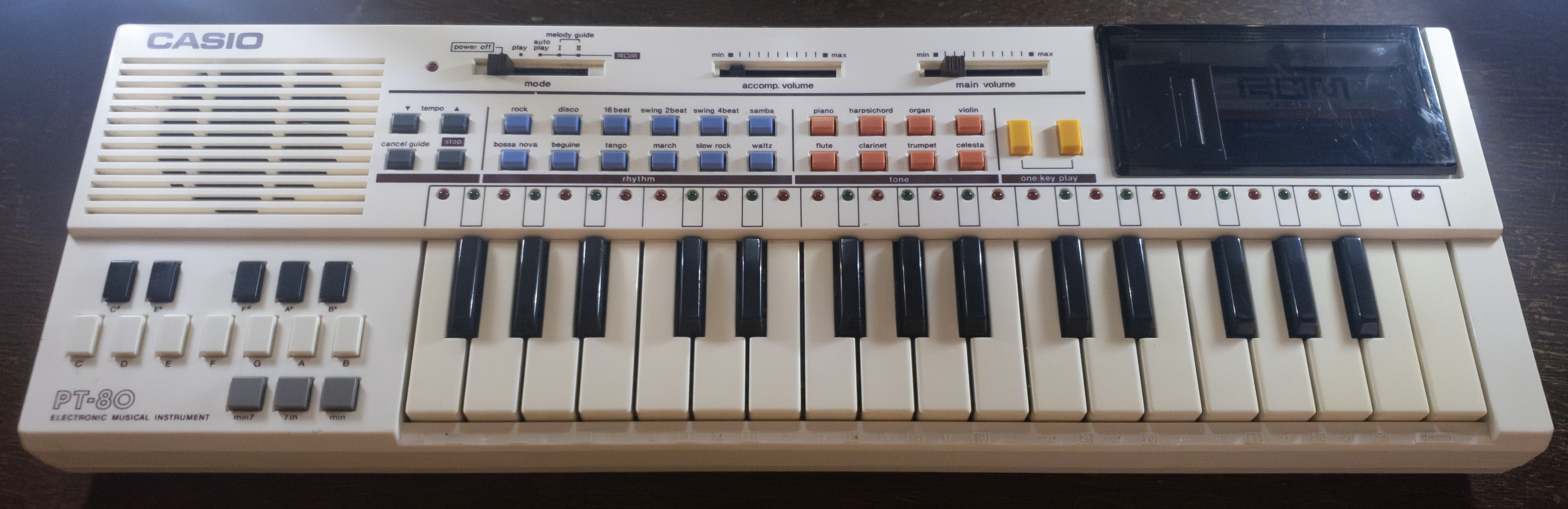
Casio PT-80

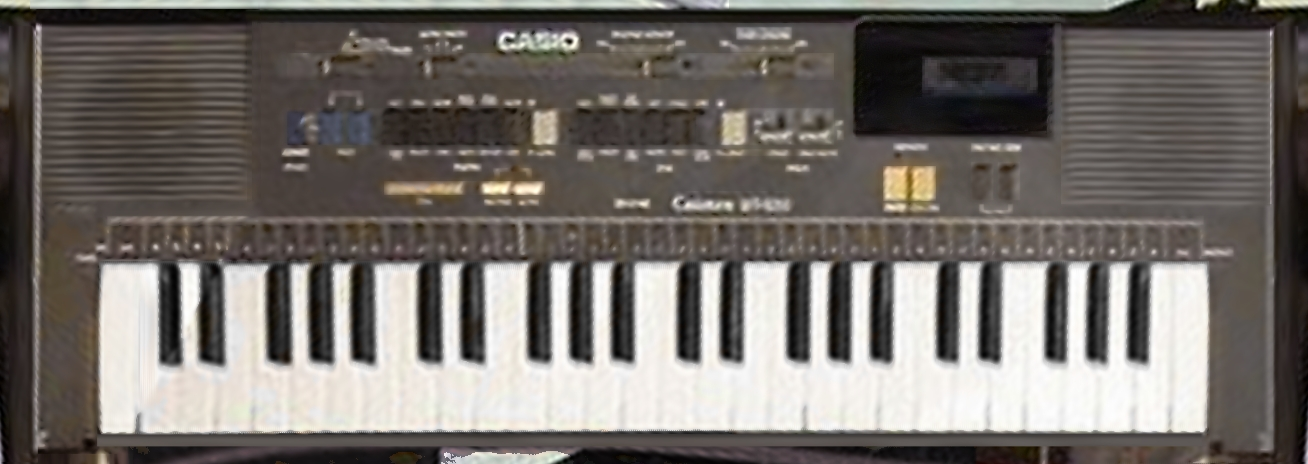
Casiotone MT-820

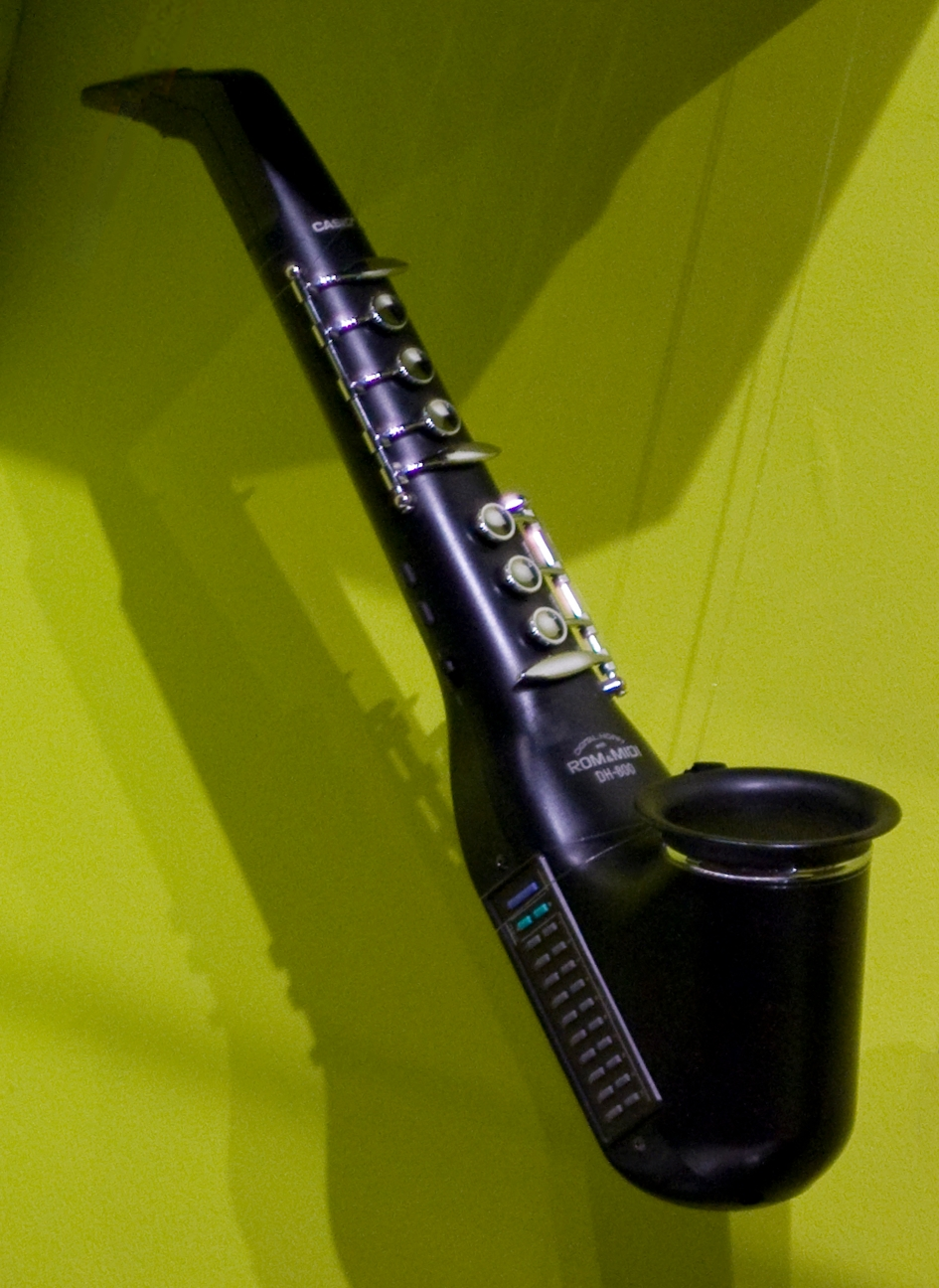
Casio DH-800 Digital Horn

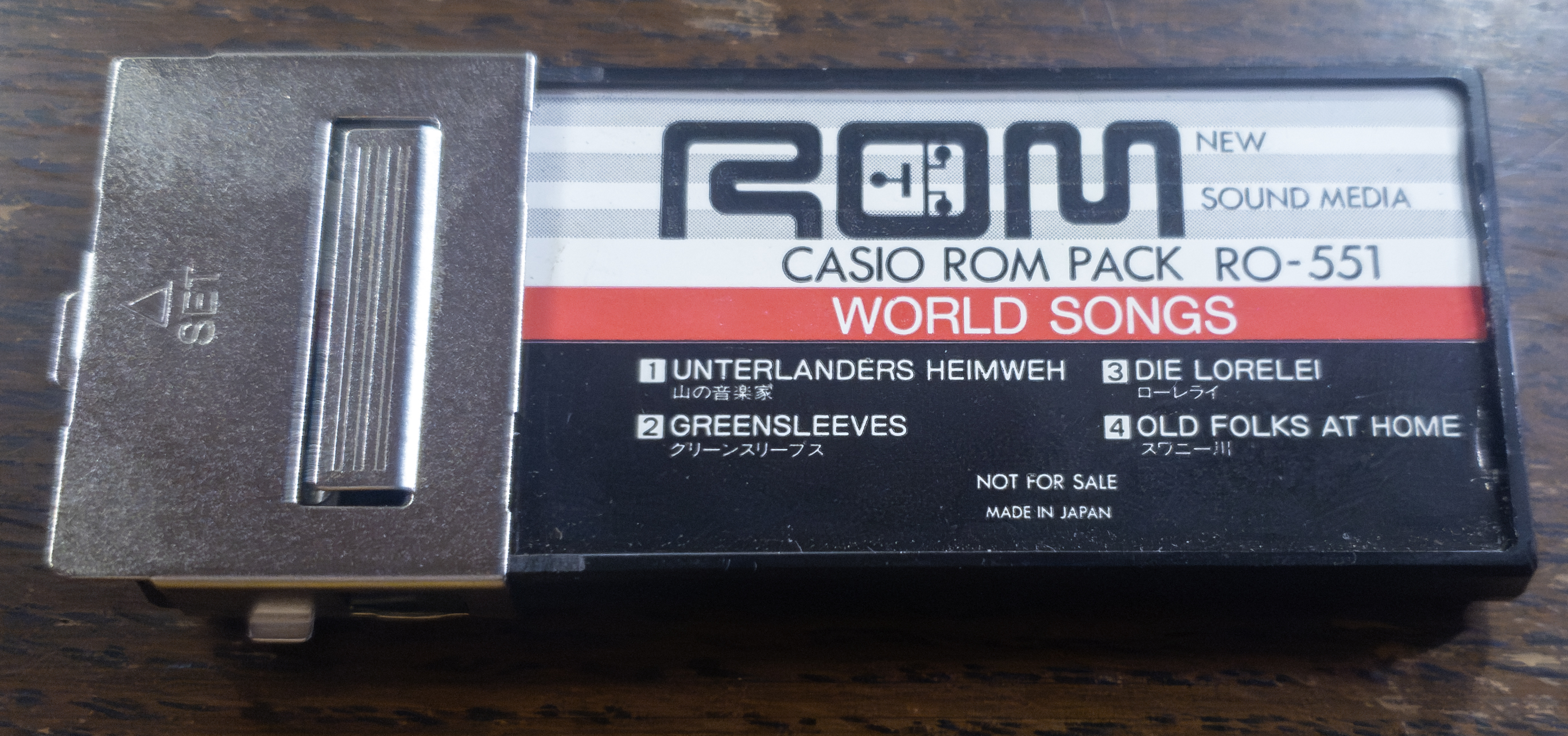
Casio RO-551 ROM pack

== Users ==
The low cost and abundance of Casiotone keyboards made them fairly common fixtures in garage rock bands. Musicians and bands known to use Casiotone keyboards include Alexis Taylor of Hot Chip, TG Miller of Black Camaro, Dan Deacon, Owen Ashworth of Casiotone for the Painfully Alone, Lettie, Maurizio Arcieri of Krisma, Kevin Parker of Tame Impala, Turnstyle, and Trio.

== Relaunch ==
In 2019, Casio relaunched the series with three new Casiotone keyboards.

== See also ==
- List of Casio keyboards
- Casio CZ synthesizer
- Casio SD Synthesizers
