= Casio AL-1 =

Relay programmable calculator

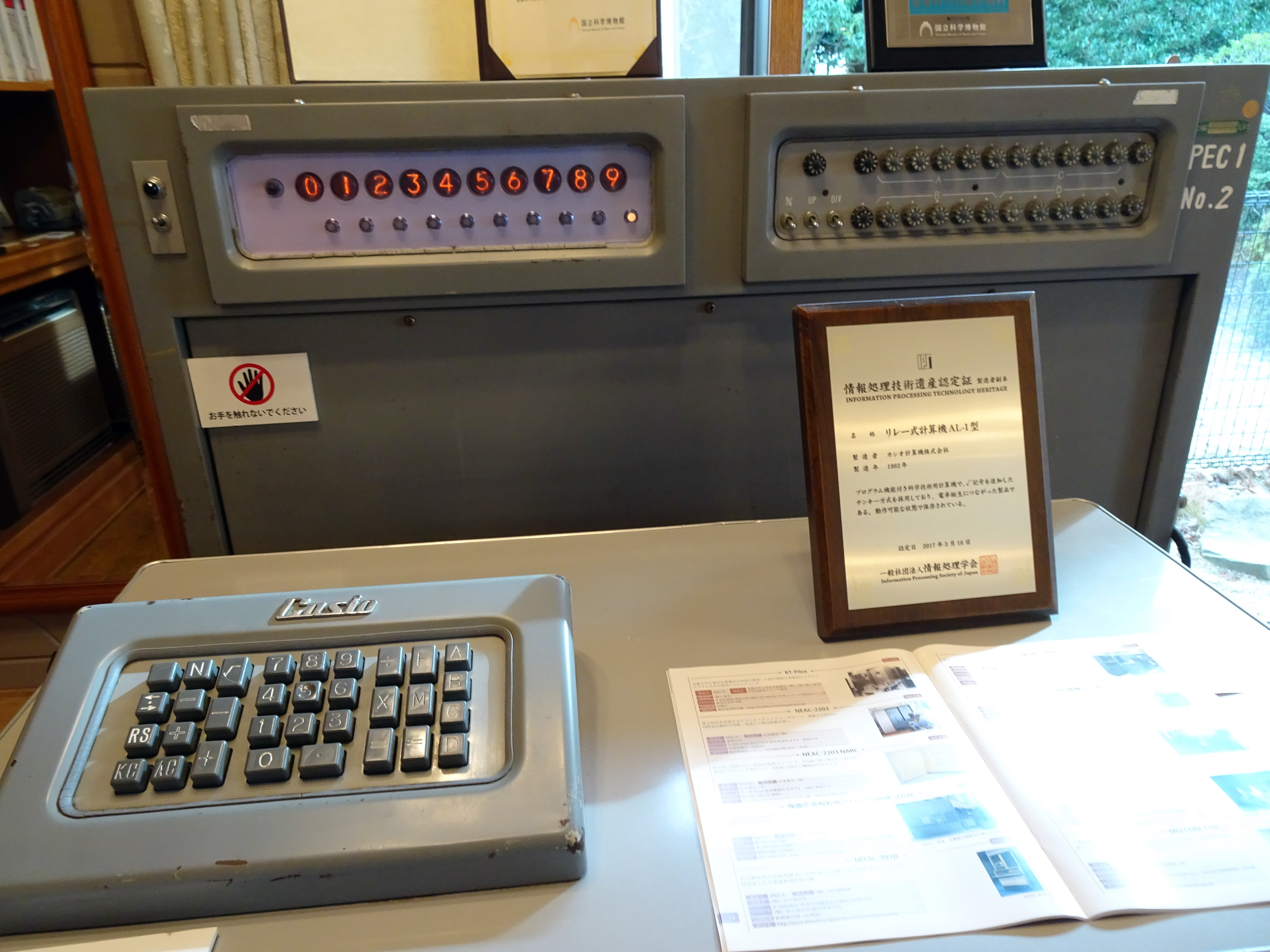
Casio AL-1 operation panel

Casio AL-1 is a Casio's relay programmable calculator released in January 1962. It is considered the precusor of the electronic calculator.

== History ==
Casio AL-1 was released in January 1962. It was a successor of Casio 301. Its development began after the feedback received from the government and universities about Casio 14-B.

== Functionality ==
Casio AL-1 is a relay decimal computer capable of solving the four basic operations (addition, subtraction, multiplication and division) and square root. It was the first calculator to feature the symbol of "√". It was capable of displaying up to 10 digits, and its internal representation of the number was bi-quinary coded decimal. It had two constants that could store a number with value up to 10 digits.

The display was made out of nixie tubes. Internally, it used about 500 relays and six resin gears with 60 teeth to perform the calculations. The user could create a program of 6 bits and 58 steps to perform pre-set calculations. It was also possible to substitute the gears to change the calculation procedures. It had the size of 110×113×42 (cm) and the initial cost was of ¥995,000.

== Impact ==
Casio AL-1 is considered a product that "led to the birth of the electronic calculator thereafter". In 2014, the National Museum of Nature and Science classified it as an essential historical material for science and technology. The Information Processing Society of Japan has also classified it as an information processing technology heritage. The University of Electro-Communications Communications Museum has one Casio AL-1 preserved.
