= Casio 301 =

Relay calculator

Casio 301 is a relay calculator released by Casio in March 1960. It was the company's first programmable calculator. It was produced after Casio 14-B, being capable of exchanging programs for science and technology calculations. Production was halted in 1961, after the release of its successor Casio AL-1.
