= Marc Martínez =

Marc Martínez may refer to:

- Marc Martínez (footballer, born 1986), Spanish footballer
- Marc Martínez (footballer, born 1990), Spanish footballer
- Marc Marzenit, born Marc Martínez, DJ and music producer

== See also ==
- Mark Martinez, American college baseball coach
