= Tadao Kashio =

Japanese businessman (1917–1993)

Tadao Kashio (樫尾 忠雄 Kashio Tadao; 26 November 1917 – 4 March 1993) was a Japanese entrepreneur and the founder of Casio.

An engineer by profession, Kashio founded Kashio Seisakujo in April 1946 and served as its president from 1960 to 1988. He led the company's development from a small manufacturing business into an international electronics company through products such as electronic calculators, electronic cash registers, digital watches, and electronic musical instruments.

== Biography ==
=== Early life ===
The second son of Shigeru and Kiyono Kashio, Tadao Kashio was born in the village of Kureta-mura, now part of Nankoku, Kōchi, in Kōchi Prefecture. His father, a farmer, moved with the family to Tokyo following the 1923 Great Kantō earthquake, where he worked as a construction worker.

As a student, Kashio sought employment to help support his father financially. He initially found work at a milk factory and was eventually hired by a factory producing military medals. Impressed by his determination, the factory manager arranged for him to become an apprentice lathe operator at a machine-tool factory. There, Kashio demonstrated considerable skill and dedication, eventually earning a recommendation from the factory's manager to attend Waseda Kōshu Gakkō (早稲田工手学校), where he studied mechanical engineering.

=== Early career and marriage ===
After graduating with a degree in engineering, Kashio worked as a manager and inventor at a valve manufacturing plant, where he demonstrated strong organizational and management skills. He devoted his free time to producing various tools and utensils until the outbreak of the Second World War, when he was employed at a factory producing radio components.

In 1943, Kashio married Shige Noguchi, with whom he had four children, three daughters and one son.

=== Founding of Kashio Seisakujo ===
In April 1946, Kashio founded Kashio Seisakujo in Mitaka, Tokyo. The company initially operated as a small subcontracting business, producing items including microscope parts and gears. Its first major commercial success was the yubiwa pipe, a ring-shaped cigarette holder that allowed the wearer to smoke a cigarette down to the nub while leaving the hands free; the product became a success in postwar Japan, where commodities were in short supply, and its profits provided capital for the development of a new type of calculator.

During the company's early years, Tadao Kashio received considerable assistance from his three younger brothers, Toshio (1925–2012), Kazuo (1929–2018), and Yukio (1930–). In 1949, after seeing an electronic calculator at the first Business Show in Ginza, the Kashio brothers began developing their own calculator. Toshio proposed using electrical circuits and solenoids instead of gears, and in December 1954 the brothers completed a prototype of an all-electric compact calculator.

They subsequently redesigned the calculator, replacing the solenoid mechanism with relays to facilitate mass production.

In June 1957, the Casio 14-A, the world's first compact all-electric calculator, went on sale, and Casio Computer Co., Ltd. was established as the development and production company for relay calculators, with Shigeru Kashio as its president.

Following his father's death in 1960, Kashio became president of the company. Under his leadership, Casio became an important international manufacturer of consumer electronics and one of the leading Japanese companies in the production of electronic calculators. The company subsequently expanded into other fields, including digital watches, electronic musical instruments, and electronic cash registers. He remained president until 1988, when he was succeeded by his brother Kazuo.

=== Later years ===
After stepping down as president, Kashio continued to work for the company as an adviser.

He died in Tokyo on 4 March 1993, at the age of 75.
