= Marc Marzenit =

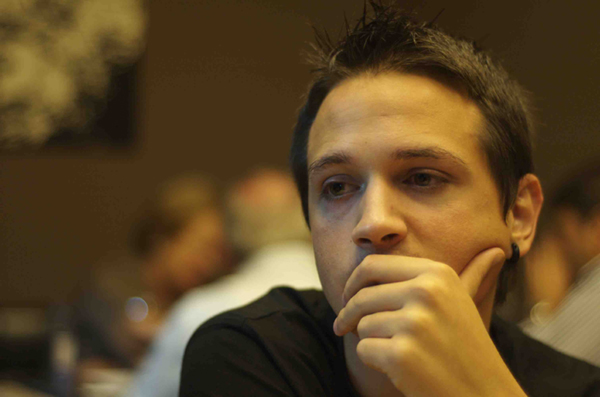
- Marc in Galicia, Spain 2007

Background information
- Also known as: Suite On Clouds
- Born: Marc Martínez; March 27, 1983 (age 43); Barcelona, Spain
- Genres: Techno, Tech House, Electronic
- Years active: 2000–present
- Label: Paradigma Musik
- Website: http://www.marcmarzenit.com/

Marc Marzenit (born Marc Martínez on March 27, 1983) is a Spanish DJ and music producer.

== Career ==
=== Early Influences ===
Marc's interest in music began at the young age of nine, making sounds on a small Casio PT1 keyboard that he attempted to plug into his father's Atari 1040ST computer. He also had musical influence from his father, who was working at a record shop in Barcelona during Marc's childhood. He obtained his first synthesizer, a Casio HT-6000, when he was eleven. He then took his musical involvement to the classical genre, studying solfège and piano at Conservatori Municipal de Mollerussa. At the age of thirteen, Marc's parents bought him an acoustic upright piano. He practiced the piano for seven years but instead of setting out on the path of classical music the young Marc followed his initial interest in electronic music. His knowledge and training in the classical arts would create a foundation for his success as an artist in this realm of music.

=== Musical Education ===
Marc continued to acquire what he needed to make electronic music with a Pentium 200 mHz computer, the Cubase software and a CD player. With these, he played his first gigs as a DJ in small venues around Lleida, Spain when he was 15 years old. In this same year, 1998, Marc visited the Sónar Festival for the first time, where he enjoyed the sounds of Laurent Garnier, Jay-Jay Johanson, and Jeff Mills. He left Sónar with his first sampler after winning an Akai hardware sampler in the Sonar Pro lottery. The following year, 1999, Marc decided to expand his knowledge of the Cubase software by enrolling in a course at the University of Lleida, however, he was too young to enroll in the course himself so he signed up under his Mother's name. He also began giving electronic music lessons through various public programs in Lleida.

In 2001 he began using the Reason software system by Propellerhead Software. So far he had not released any tracks, but was spending his time educating himself on equipment, sound and technique. The following year, at the age of 19, Marc purchased his first laptop, an iBook G3 and played his first live set in Mollerussa, Spain. In 2003 Marc moved back to Barcelona, where he studied for three years to obtain a bachelor's degree in Audio Engineering. While studying, he was also working as a sound engineer for the Teatre L'Amistat, the public theater in Mollerussa and continued teaching music production in the city of Lleida. His professional involvement allowed him to work in different musical themes in television and radio ads as well as several audio-visual projects.

=== Building A Career ===
Marc's gigs became more consistent as he started playing at Club Zoreks about every two months. There he met other artists such as David Carreta, Funk D’void and Alex Under. On December 25, 2005, Marc's career took a turn when he played at club Florida 135, his biggest performance as a DJ thus far. The night was considered a success as it drew a large crowd and Marc was soon after taken on by an international booking manager, Fran Balsa. Shortly after his performance at Florida 135, in April 2006, Marc made his first international trip to play a set at the clubs Zurmöbelfabrik and Pulp Mansion in Berlin, Germany. While in Berlin, Marc also met Xema Belmonte, Sergio Rodrigo, and Jordi Sansa, with whom he would soon form the music label Paradigma Musik. In 2020 he was selected as a Karman Fellow for his work exploring how art will be in space.

== Discography ==
=== Original Tracks ===
- 2006: Trozitos de Navidad (Paradigma Musik) EP & Trozitos de Navidad (Primavera Remix)
- 2006: Music Save Me (Paradigma Musik) EP
- 2007: Spheere (Regular) EP
- 2007: Today is Yesterday (Regular) EP & Today is Yesterday (Claustrophobia Remix)
- 2009: Second Vision – collaboration with Henry Saiz (Sudbeat) Visions EP
- 2009: Angels Die (Sudbeat) Visions EP
- 2009: Soul Fog (Sudbeat) Visions EP
- 2009: I Don't Wanna Be a Hype (Paradigma Musik) From The Deep
- 2009: Not Assigned (Bedrock Records) Bedrock Eleven
- 2009: Expiritualized (Bedrock Records) Bedrock Eleven
- 2009: Unexpiritualized (Bedrock Records) Bedrock Eleven
- 2009: ITS Caracas (Paradigma Musik) Paradigma 014
- 2010: Maya Colors (Cocoon Digital) Maya & Tulku EP
- 2010: Tulku (Cocoon Digital) Maya & Tulku EP
- 2010: Motor (Cocoon Digital) Maya & Tulku EP
- 2010: Neo Galaxy (Bedrock Records) Bedrock Structures
- 2011: 10,000 Fears - Free Download on SoundCloud

=== Appearances ===
- 2006: Electro Thinks (Votox Records) Votox No1 Welxxcome
- 2006: Trozitos de Navidad (Trax Magazine) Trax #30
- 2006: Remixer (Miga) Exponencial
- 2006: Remixer (Micromix) Ferik - Micromix 70
- 2006: Remixer (Zerinnerung) Stimulux - Southern Sounds Vol. 2
- 2007: Trozitos de Navidad Primavera Remix (Songbird) Tiësto - In Search Of Sunrise 6: Ibiza
- 2007: Spheere (Renaissance) John Digweed - Transitions Vol. 3
- 2007: Trozitos de Navidad Primavera Remix (Black Hole Recordings) Mr Sam - Opus
- 2007: Trozitos de Navidad (The Sound of Everything) Concealed Truth
- 2007: Trozitos de Navidad (Icic) Electronic Music from Catalonia - De Catalunya 2007
- 2008: Trozitos de Navidad (121 Records) La Plage Des Bikinis
- 2009: I Don't Wanna Be A Hype (Paradigma Musik) From The Deep
- 2009 : Not Assigned (Cocoon Recordings) Sven Väth - In The Mix - The Sound Of The 10th Season
- 2009: Not Assigned, Expiritualized & Unexpiritualized (Bedrock Records) John Digweed - Bedrock Eleven
- 2009: Soul Fog & Second Vision (Renaissance) Hernán Cattáneo - Renaissance: The Masters Series Part 13
- 2010: Neo Galaxy (Bedrock Records) John Digweed - Structures
- 2010: Saint Two (Renaissance) Hernán Cattáneo - Renaissance: The Masters Series Part 16 - Parallel
- 2010: ITS Caracas (Paul Ritch Remix), (Kontor Records) Felix Kröcher - Discover

=== Remixes ===
- 2008: Together (Marc Marzenit Remix) Simon & Shaker - Surfaces #1: Plastic (Armada Music)
- 2008: We Are Losing Touch (Marc Marzenit Remix) bRUNA - Heartache E.P. (Paradigma Musik)
- 2008: Vancouver (Marc Marzenit Remix) – Henry Saiz (Catalan! Music, ICIC)
- 2008: Together (Marc Marzenit Remix) Funkagenda - Together (Shelvin Records)
- 2008: Vancouver (Marc Marzenit Remix) Henry Saiz - Vancouver (Natura Sanoris)
- 2010: Ripple (Marc Marzenit Remix) Max Cooper - Expressions Remixes (Traum Schallplatten)
- 2010: Bloody Hands (Marc Marzenit Remix) Peter Horrevorts - Bloody Hands EP (Gem Records)
- 2010: Neo (Marc Marzenit Remix) Simon & Shaker - Space Of Sound Festival 2010 (Blanco y Negro)
- 2010: Bloody Hands (Marc Marzenit Monster Remix) Wally Lopez - Global Underground (Global Underground Ltd.)
- 2010: Bloody Hands (Marc Marzenit Monster Mix) Pan-Pot - OHMcast 028 (OnlyHouseMusic)
- 2010: Bloody Hands (Marc Marzenit Remix) Secret Cinema - Welcome To My Club - 1st Issue (Gem Records)
- 2011: Mutant (Marc Marzenit Haunted House Remix) – Patch Park (Ground Factory Records)
- 2011: Aurora Borealis (Henry Saiz & Marc Marzenit Remix) - Ian O'Donovan (Bedrock Records)
- 2011: ID (Marc Marzenit Remix) - Monaque (microCastle)
