= Casio CZ synthesizers =

Family of synthesizers by Casio

Casio CZ
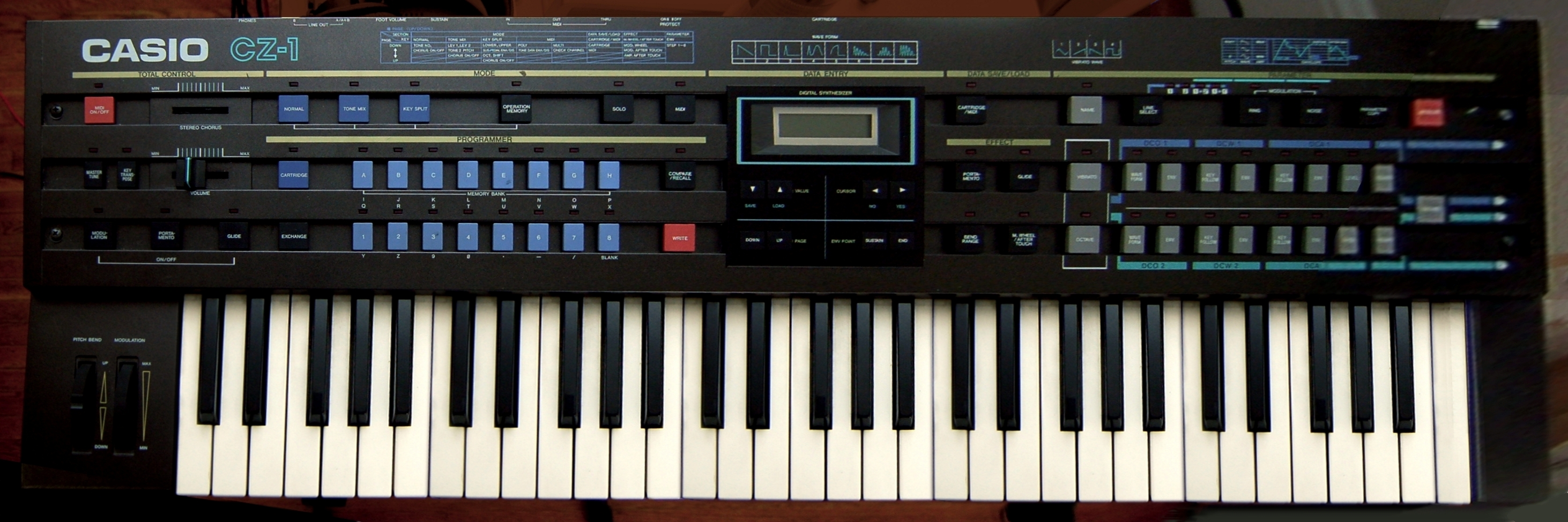
- Casio CZ-1
- Manufacturer: Casio

Technical specifications

Input/output

The CZ series is a line of low-cost phase distortion synthesizers produced by Casio beginning in 1984. Eight models of CZ synthesizers were released: the CZ-101, CZ-230S, CZ-1000, CZ-2000S, CZ-2600S, CZ-3000, CZ-5000, and the CZ-1. Additionally, the home-keyboard model CT-6500 used 48 phase distortion presets. The CZ series was priced affordably while having professional features. Around the same time, Yamaha released their low-cost FM synthesizers, including the DX21 and DX100, which cost nearly twice as much.

== Programming ==
Eight basic waveforms on Casio CZ series. Also non-resonant waveforms 1~5 can cascade with other waveforms, and as a result, 33 waveforms (basic:8, cascade:25) are available.

Casio's phase distortion synthesis technique was championed by Casio engineer Mark Fukuda and evolved from the Cosmo Synth System that was developed in collaboration with synthesist-composer Isao Tomita. Yukihiro Takahashi was also on board during development. To make the CZ synthesizers inexpensive, so they would be affordable to amateur musicians (a much larger market than the professional musician market), Casio used digital synthesis without a filter instead of traditional analog subtractive synthesis with a filter. Like many early digital synthesizers, its sound was regarded as "thinner" than the sound of an analog synthesizer. However, the CZ line used phase distortion to simulate an analog filter. It had in total eight different waveforms: as well as the standard sawtooth, square, and pulse waveforms, it had a special double sine waveform, a half-sine waveform, and three waveforms with simulated filter resonance: resonant sawtooth, triangle, and trapezoidal waveforms. The simulated filter resonance was not considered to sound much like real filter resonance, being a simple waveform at the filter cutoff value instead of a real filter resonating.

Each digital oscillator could have one or two waveforms. Unlike other synthesizers, where having multiple waveforms caused those multiple waveforms to be mixed together (parallel), the CZ synthesizers would play one waveform and then play the other, and so on in alternation (series). This could cause the appearance of a sub-harmonic one octave below the nominal pitch of the sound, due to the period of the combined waveform taking twice as long as a single waveform would. It was possible to combine two non-resonant waveforms together, and to combine a resonant waveform with a non-resonant waveform, but it was not possible to combine two resonant waveforms.

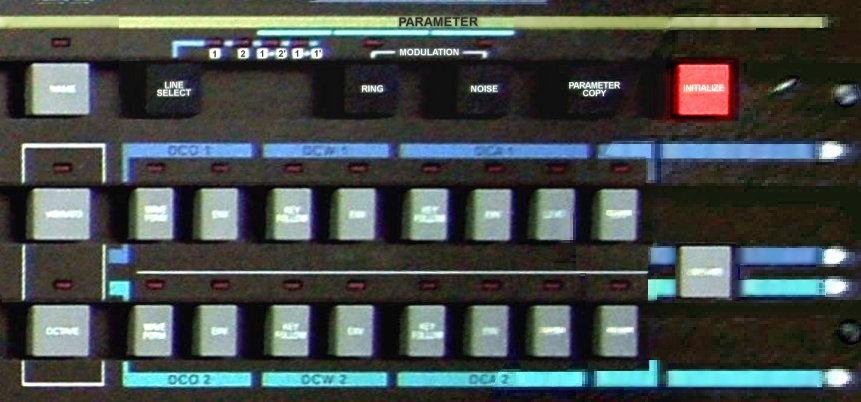
Parameter panel on Casio CZ-1. Two set of parameters on panels are used on 'tone mix' and 'key split' modes.

=== Digital Controlled Oscillator (DCO) ===
The CZ-101 and CZ-1000 have eight digital oscillators, each with a dedicated 8-stage pitch envelope. For patches using one oscillator per voice, this allows 8-note polyphony, If two oscillators per voice are used, the polyphony is limited to four voices. The CZ-3000, CZ-5000, and CZ-1 had sixteen digital oscillators, making them sixteen- or eight-voice synthesizers. Each of the oscillators in a two-oscillator patch could be independently programmed.

=== Digital Controlled Wave (DCW) ===
The DCW adjusts the magnitude of phase distortion that is applied to the oscillator. For non-resonant wave shapes, the DCW value adjusts the oscillator's harmonic content such that minimum setting produces a sine wave, while maximum setting produces the selected wave shape. For resonant-type wave shapes, the DCW value instead controls the perceived resonant frequency. The DCW can be modified using an 8-stage envelope, thus changing the timbre of the sound over time. In this capacity, it was described by Casio in the CZ-1's manual as being phase distortion synthesis's equivalent of the VCF (voltage-controlled filter) in analogue synthesizers.

=== Digital Controlled Amplifier (DCA) ===
The DCA (which determined how loud a given oscillator is at a given moment) was also modulated by another dedicated 8-stage envelope generator. The DCW and DCA also had a "key follow" feature, which changes the character of the envelope the higher you go on the keyboard, with the DCW producing a gradually more dull sound the higher you go and the DCA envelope acting faster the higher you go.

=== Modulations ===
==== 8-step Envelope Generators (EG) ====
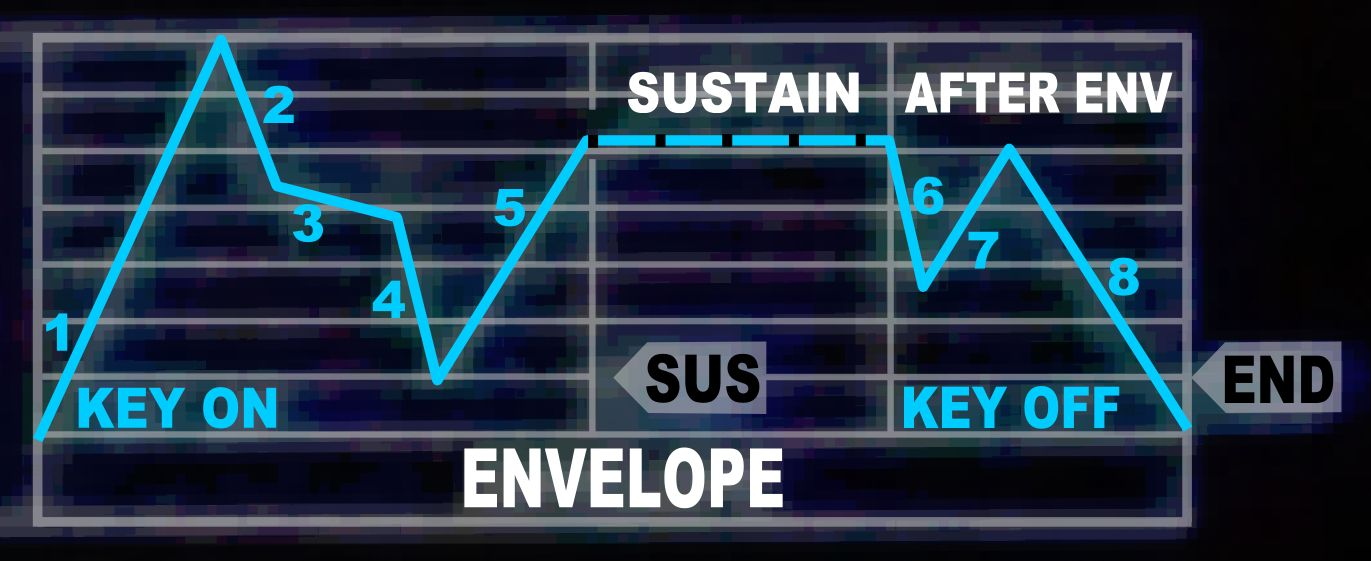
8-step envelope generator chart

The envelope generators in the CZ synthesizers were far more flexible than a traditional four-stage ADSR envelope; They were eight-stage envelope generators where each stage had a rate and level value. The rate value determined how fast the envelope would move; the level value would determine what pitch/filter cutoff/volume the envelope would have. Sustain and End points could be assigned to any stage of the envelope.

==== LFO ====
LFO waveforms

The synthesizers have a single configurable LFO for inducing vibrato, whose settings apply to all notes played in a given patch, although each note has its own independently triggered/cycling LFO (polyphonic LFOs). The LFO can use triangle, square, upward (ramp) sawtooth, or downward sawtooth waveforms. The modulatory effects of the LFO are controlled by three settings: speed, depth, and delay.

The pitch of a voice can also be modulated by a dedicated eight-stage envelope, although this can only increase the pitch of a sound, rather than being bidirectional.

==== Ring and Noise modulators ====
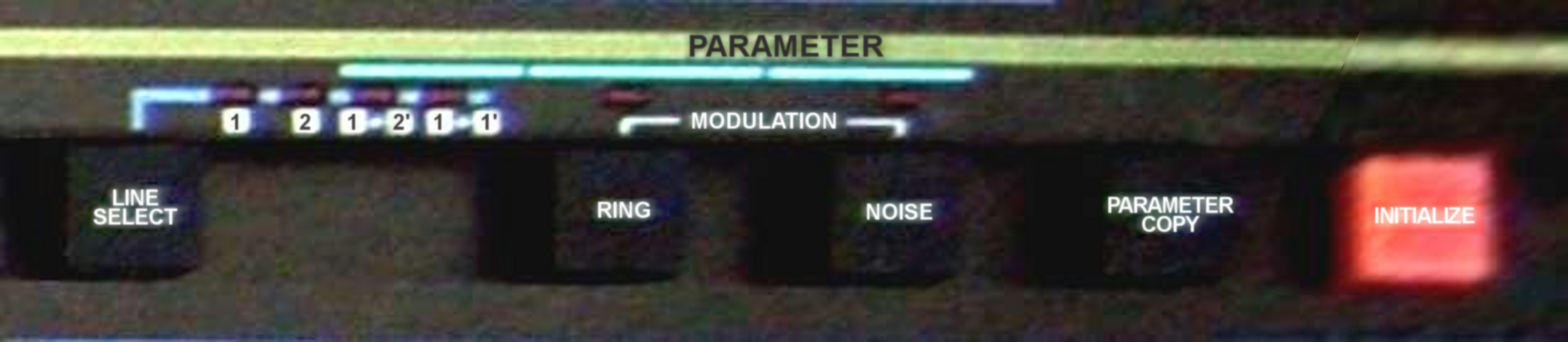
Ring & Noise modulators

It was possible to modulate the two voices in a two-voice patch in two different ways. Ring modulation had the output of one of the oscillators affect the volume of the other oscillator, resulting in a controlled distortion. Noise modulation caused the second voice in a two-voice patch to sound like digital noise, roughly simulating the effect of an analog synthesizer's noise source.

=== Tone mix mode ===
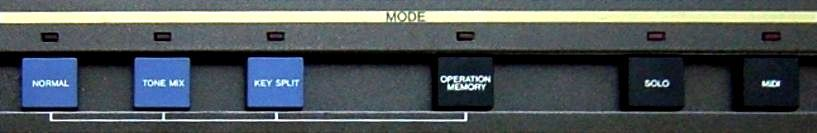
Casio CZ-1 mode panel

The CZ synthesizers also had the ability to stack up two different sounds via the "tone mix" feature resulting in a functionally monophonic synthesizer; this was Casio's version of the "unison" feature other polyphonic synthesizers had. Each part in a two-patch stack could be a different patch, allowing great flexibility in stacked sounds. It was not possible to detune the two patches in a tone mix stack; this could be somewhat worked around, however, by giving each of the two patches a different vibrato rate.

=== Comparison to analogue subtractive synthesizers ===
The CZ synthesizers were missing some features common to analog synthesizers: LFO can't modulate DCW, which prevents pulse width modulation; the simulated resonance was an either-or proposition; with the exception of a resonant form, it did not have a triangle wave.

== Individual models ==
=== CZ-101 ===
Casio CZ-101

The CZ-101 was the first and best-selling synthesizer in this line. Approximately 68,500 were manufactured. Released in November 1984, it was one of the first (if not the first) fully programmable polyphonic synthesizers that was available for under $500. In order to keep the price low, several compromises were made. The CZ-101 only had 49 keys (4 octaves from C to C) instead of the 61 keys most synthesizers had. Instead of full sized keys, the CZ-101 used miniature keys. It had pegs for a guitar strap so it could be worn, a compartment for 6 D-size batteries, and a headphone output but no internal speaker. It was discontinued by Casio in 1988.

=== CZ-230S ===
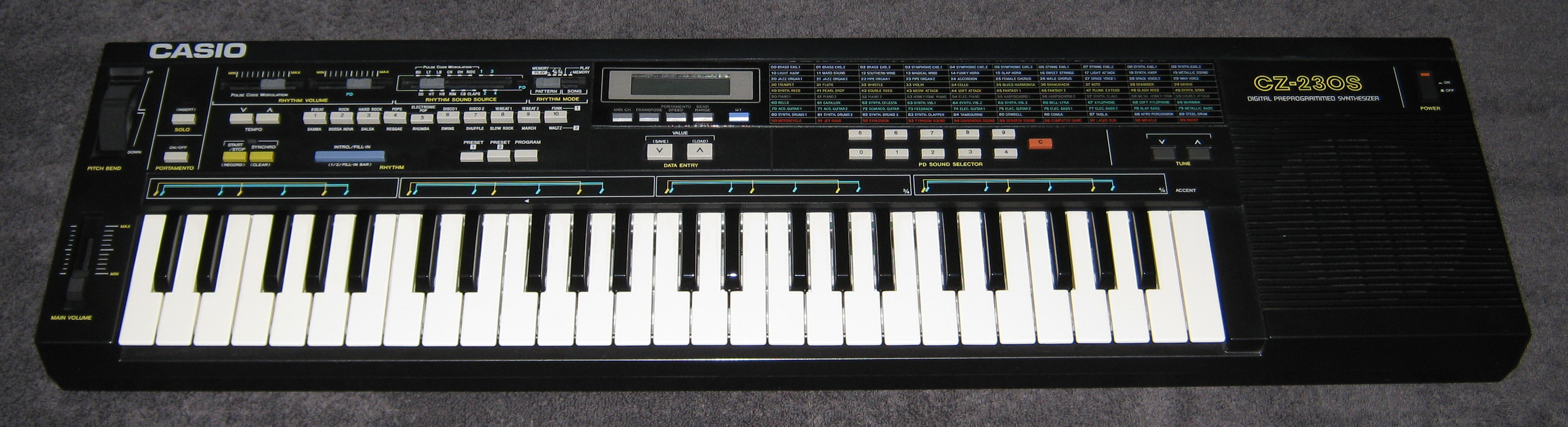
Casio CZ-230S

The CZ-230S was released in 1986. Despite the CZ-230S's model numbering, it was not really a programmable synthesizer; the specifications of this model more closely resembled that of one of Casio's home keyboard models. It used the synthesizer technology of the CZ-101 in a 100 tone preset sound bank, had a mini keyboard of 49 keys, incorporated the RZ1 drum computer technology and had a built-in speaker. Only four of the sounds in the sound bank could be programmed by linking the synthesizer to a computer via its MIDI port.

=== CZ-1000 ===
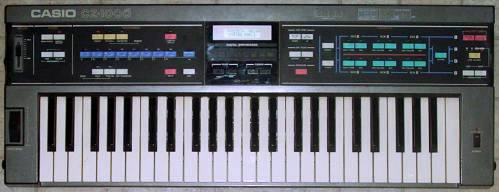
Casio CZ-1000

The CZ-1000 was the second fully programmable phase distortion synthesizer that Casio introduced. This synthesizer, introduced in 1984, was identical to the CZ-101 in function, but used full size keys and more attractive membrane buttons. It was also somewhat larger than the CZ-101. Like the CZ-101, this synthesizer had 49 keys.

=== CZ-2000S ===
The CZ-2000S synthesizer was a model that was not sold in North America. It was identical to the CZ-3000 except that it also had built-in speakers.

=== CZ-2600S ===
The CZ-2600S synthesizer was a model that was not sold in North America. It was identical to the CZ-2000S except that it was a stereo model.

=== CZ-3000 ===
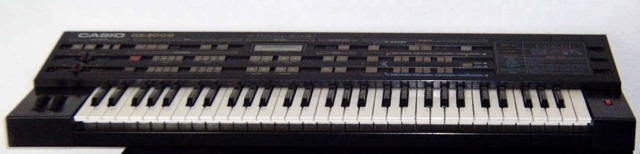
Casio CZ-3000

The CZ-3000 synthesizer used the same phase distortion engine as the CZ-101 and the CZ-1000, but added the following features:

- The synthesizer had eight voices instead of four voices (16 oscillators instead of eight)
- It was possible to split the keyboard (in other words, have some keys play one sound while other keys played another sound).
- The synthesizer had 61 keys, not 49 keys
- There was a built-in stereo chorus effect
- Instead of having just a pitch bend wheel, the CZ-3000 had both a pitch bend wheel and a modulation wheel.

=== CZ-5000 ===
The CZ-5000 synthesizer was almost identical to the CZ-3000, but had a built in 8 track sequencer. In most other regards, it was virtually identical to the other CZ series synthesizers.

=== CZ-1 ===
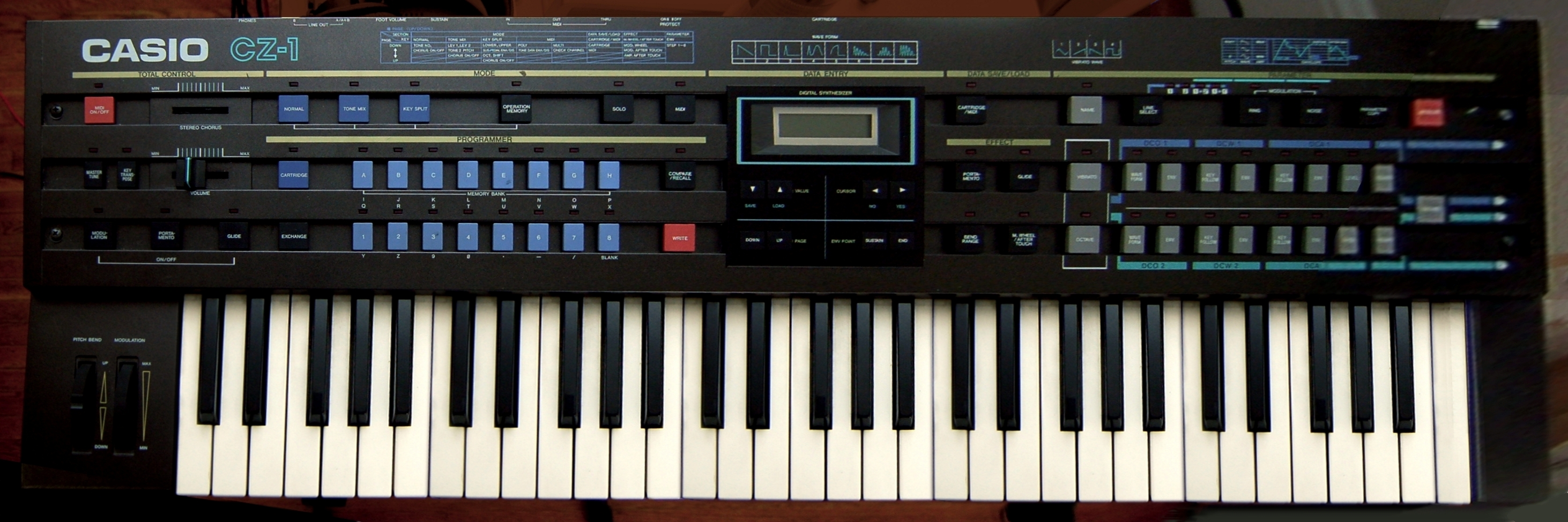
Casio CZ-1

The CZ-1 synthesizer is most advanced in the CZ series. It doubled the memory, was multitimbral, also stored splits and layers as "Operation Memories", and added velocity and aftertouch sensitivity to the keyboard, along with programming parameters to control how velocity and aftertouch pressure would affect the sound. It features three modes 'normal' (1 tone 16 voice), 'tone mix' and 'key split' (2 tones with 8 voices each). In the 2 tone modes the chorus setting controls which tone goes to which of the left and right output channels. With external effects the lack of negative velocity volume control can be circumvented and velocity crossfades between tones can be achieved using the separate output channels. Page 12 of the CZ-1 operation manual explains the tone output channel settings. The CZ-1 also featured a backlit display which is lacking on the rest of the series. The only features that the CZ-1 lacked in comparison to some other models was the basic sequencer or drum machine sometimes furnished.

== Related models ==
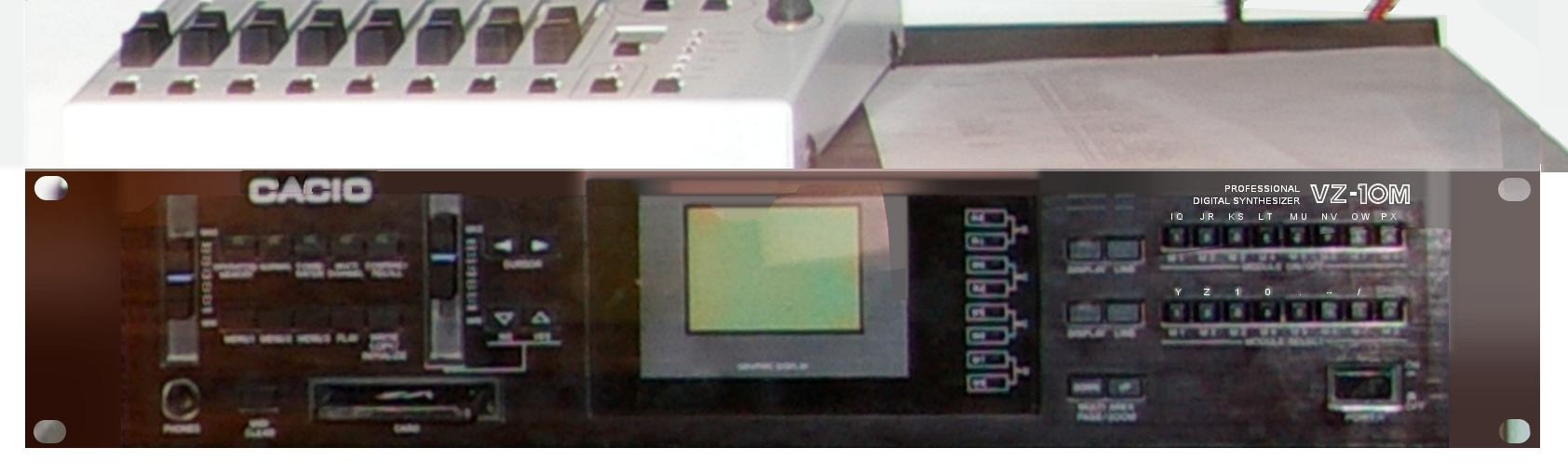
Casio VZ-10M

=== VZ series synthesizers ===
Casio VZ series utilize Interactive Phase Distortion synthesis (iPD synthesis). Although named similarly, this is much more similar to Yamaha-style phase modulation synthesis than to Casio-style PD: the modulators in iPD are oscillating waveforms, rather than the angular functions of the original PD. Thus the CZ and VZ engines are quite different and not directly compatible, filling different sonic and architectural niches.

Models:

- VZ-1 (keyboard with 16 voices) a.k.a. Hohner HS-2 (rebadged for the European market)
- VZ-10M (2U rack module; functionally identical to the VZ-1) a.k.a. Hohner HS-2/E
- VZ-8M (1U rack module expander with 8 voices but a few new features)

== See also ==
- Phase distortion synthesis
- Casio
- Synthesizer
- Musical instrument
- Musical keyboard
- Casio SD Synthesizers
- Casio MT-40
- Casiotone
