= Casio SD Synthesizers =

Line of analog synthesizers by Casio

Casio's SD ("Spectrum Dynamic") Synthesizers were a late-1980s line of analog synthesizers featuring a resonant filter. SD synthesis was traditional DCO-analog synthesis, with the main difference being that some of the SD waveforms' harmonic spectrums changed temporally, or dynamically in relation to the amplitude envelope.

SD synthesis is used in seven Casio synthesizers and home keyboards released in 1987 and produced until 1991, when Casio exited the synthesizer market completely and focused solely on pure consumer keyboards. Due to some programming limitations plus Casio's poor marketing, the SD synths never gained wide popularity and are now fairly rare in the second-hand marketplace (which adds to their charm, according to some).

There still exists a small but devoted fanbase who insist that SD synthesis, particularly as expanded in the high-end model HT-6000, was overlooked and highly underrated and today rare.

== Background ==
SD Synthesis followed on the heels of the more advanced Phase-Distortion (PD) Synthesis employed in the successful line of Casio CZ synthesizers. When Casio decided to retire the CZ line, they decided to go in two directions: more complex (the VZ "Interactive" Phase Distortion line), and more traditional (SD synthesis, starting with the HZ-600). In turning to SD synthesis Casio meant to create a synthesis engine that was more comprehensible and accessible than Phase Distortion synthesis. Yamaha's then-active lawsuit against Casio's PD synthesis method, which claimed PD synthesis infringed on patents of Yamaha's including their famous frequency modulation synthesis, may also have contributed to Casio's development of SD synthesis to diversify their offering.

The 1987 Casio HZ-600 was the initial model and was considered an entry-level offshoot of the "Z" series of synthesizers that included the CZ and VZ lines. The subsequent SD synthesizers were marketed as advanced home keyboards (i.e., including speakers and programmable accompaniment) launched under the HT prefix (with the notable exception of the non-editable, preset-only Casiotone versions, the MT-600 and CT-630).

== SD Synthesis Details ==
SD (Spectrum Dynamic) Synthesis was modeled on traditional DCO-VCF-DCA analog synthesis but used waveforms that included predefined variations over time. The SD sound source is a 4-bit (16-step) digitally controlled oscillator (DCO) that uses waveforms including triangles, sawtooth, squares of different widths, and some unusual pulses, plus various combinations thereof.

The DCO has preprogrammed control of the timbre of the waveform, and some (but not all) of the available waveforms are "moving", meaning that their spectra are designed to change as the DCA envelope progresses. For example, one waveform has an octave-unison effect where the higher harmonics fade in over time. This predefined temporal motion of the harmonic spectrum yields the term "Spectrum Dynamic."

The user has very limited influence over the spectrum dynamic using the DCA envelope, and doing so is something of a trial-and-error process. In effect, each so-called "waveform" of an SD synth consists of 2 layered sub voices with independent preset volume envelopes (that cannot be changed by the user). Thus, some "waveforms" crossfade between timbres without filter sweep to simulate e.g. the brighter attack phase of metallic clangs or picked strings.

Most SD synthesizers use a single DCO (plus a digital noise generator for certain waveforms) per voice, and offer 32 possible waveforms. The top-of-the-line Casio HT-6000 offered 64 possible waveforms, 4 DCOs per voice, velocity, detuning, ring-modulation, and an expanded SD parameter set.

In SD synthesis, an analog voltage-controlled resonant filter (VCF) is used to shape the DCO's waveform (whereas on Casio CZ Synthesizers the phase distortion engine could only emulate a resonant filter). The SD sound is further shaped by a digitally controlled amplitude (DCA) envelope. Both the VCF and DCA are programmed with traditional 4-stage attack/decay/sustain/release (ADSR) curves [whereas the CZ line used sophisticated 8-stage envelopes and also included a pitch envelope].

Finally, like on the CZ's, a low-frequency oscillator (LFO) is programmable to modulate the DCO pitch, but unfortunately it cannot modulate the VCF or DCA. Nearly all of the SD synth parameters had 5-bit precision, allowing a stepwise range of 0-31.

== Summary of Models ==
=== HZ-600 ===
The HZ-600 was the first SD synthesizer, and was the only SD synthesizer built to look like a "professional" synthesizer, i.e., without built-in speakers or auto-accompaniment controls. In contrast to the bulky-looking Casio CZ line, the HZ-600 was deliberately styled after the sleek-looking Roland Alpha Juno 2 right down to the inclusion of an "alpha-dial" programming wheel.

The HZ-600 was a 61-key, 8-note polyphonic basic-MIDI synthesizer without initial- or after-touch, and functionally was essentially an advanced Korg Poly-800. Like the Poly-800, all voices (in each channel) shared a single VCF, meaning the VCF envelope would retrigger when a new note was played, affecting all previous notes still playing.

The HZ-600 included 3 levels of onboard analog chorus, 3 selectable keyboard split points, 3 selectable pitch-bender ranges, a modulation wheel, transpose, and a card slot for the new sleek Casio RA-100 RAM cards, which had 8K of memory. Unlike the CZ series, portamento was not available.

=== MT-600 ===
The MT-600 was a non-programmable home keyboard variant of the HT-700. While not technically a synthesizer (the tones could not be altered and new sounds could not be created), it used the SD synthesis engine and had the same preset patches as the HZ-600 (arranged in a different order). The case of the MT-600 was smaller than the HZ-600, with only 49 mini-keys, but as a home keyboard it did include stereo speakers and auto-accompaniment. The MT-600 included a pitch-bender, which was unusual for home keyboards at the time. Unlike the HZ-600, the pitch bend range was not selectable. Auto-accompaniment used a fixed bass patch, and the "lower tone" sounds of the HZ-600 for chords. Drums were low-resolution 8-bit PCM samples and resembled an expanded Casio SK-5 drumkit. The MT-600 was a 3-part multitimbral for use as a MIDI sound source.

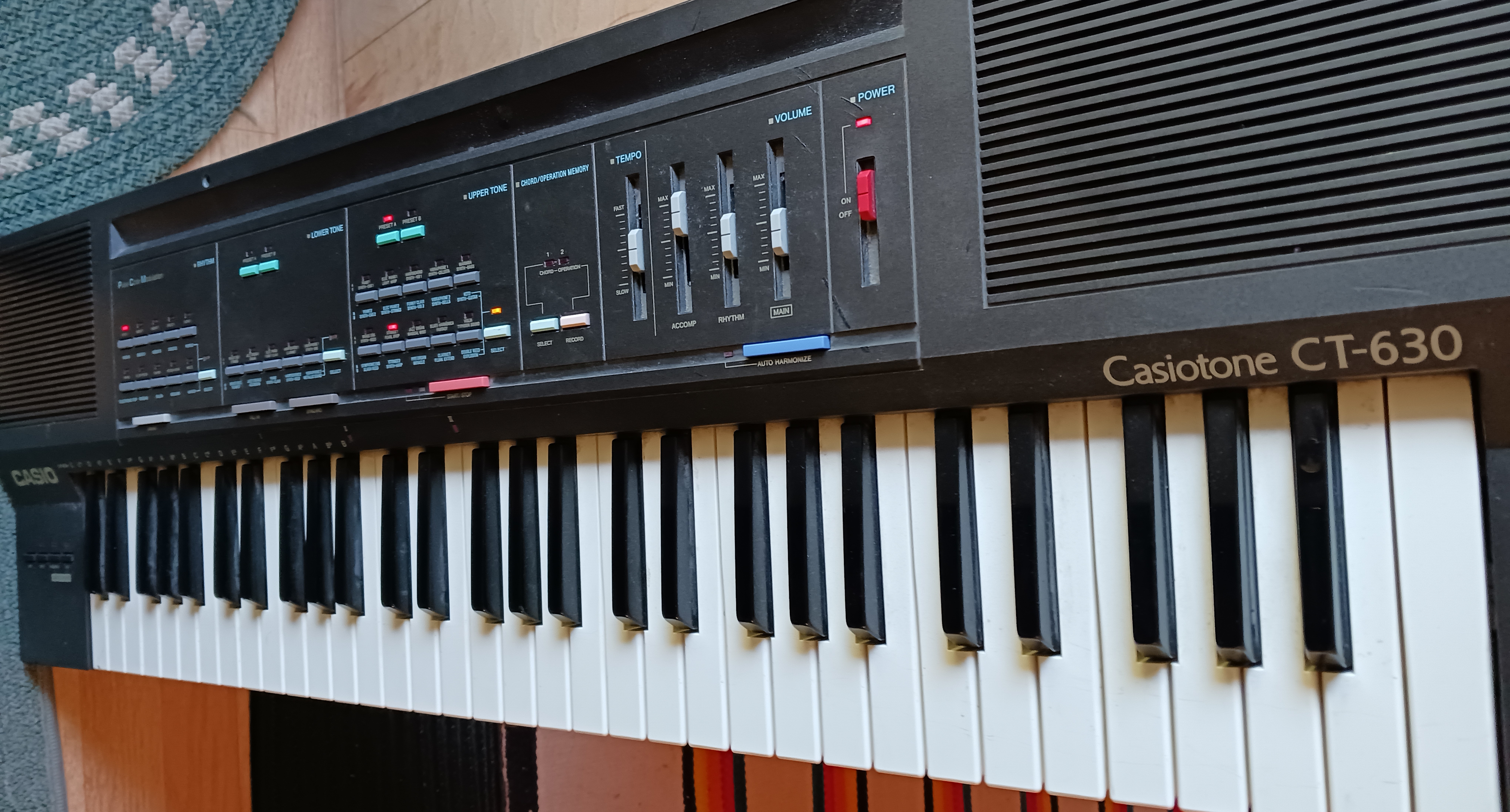
The CT-630

=== CT-630 ===
The CT-630 was a non-programmable home keyboard variant of the HT-3000. It had 61 full-size keys, stereo speakers, MIDI THRU, 1/4" stereo output jacks, volume pedal jack, sustain pedal jack and a 3-point splittable keyboard. It included the "Ending" and "Auto Harmonize" features but did not have any pitch bending capability, even through MIDI. It used nearly the same case as the HT-3000, with an unused space for a RAM card slot. Released by Hohner as the PK100.

=== HT-700 ===
The HT-700 was the user-programmable version of the MT-600 (hence the prefix HT). It included the fully editable SD synthesis of the HZ-600, plus it took the auto-accompaniment of the MT-600 and made it fully editable too (a very rare and powerful feature). Users could fully program their 2-measure patterns consisting of drums, basslines and chord inversions. The fill-in measure was also programmable. The HT-700 had 49 mini-keys and a pitch bender, and looked somewhat similar to the MT-600. Unlike the MT-600, though, it included a programming wheel and a card slot for Casio RA-100 RAM cards. The HT-700 and other HT synths could not store nearly as many patches to a RAM card as the HZ-600, because most of the RAM card capacity was reserved to store accompaniment patterns and chord/operation sequences. The HT-700 was also sold by Hohner in Germany as the 'KS-49 midi' (with a slightly different preset sound set).

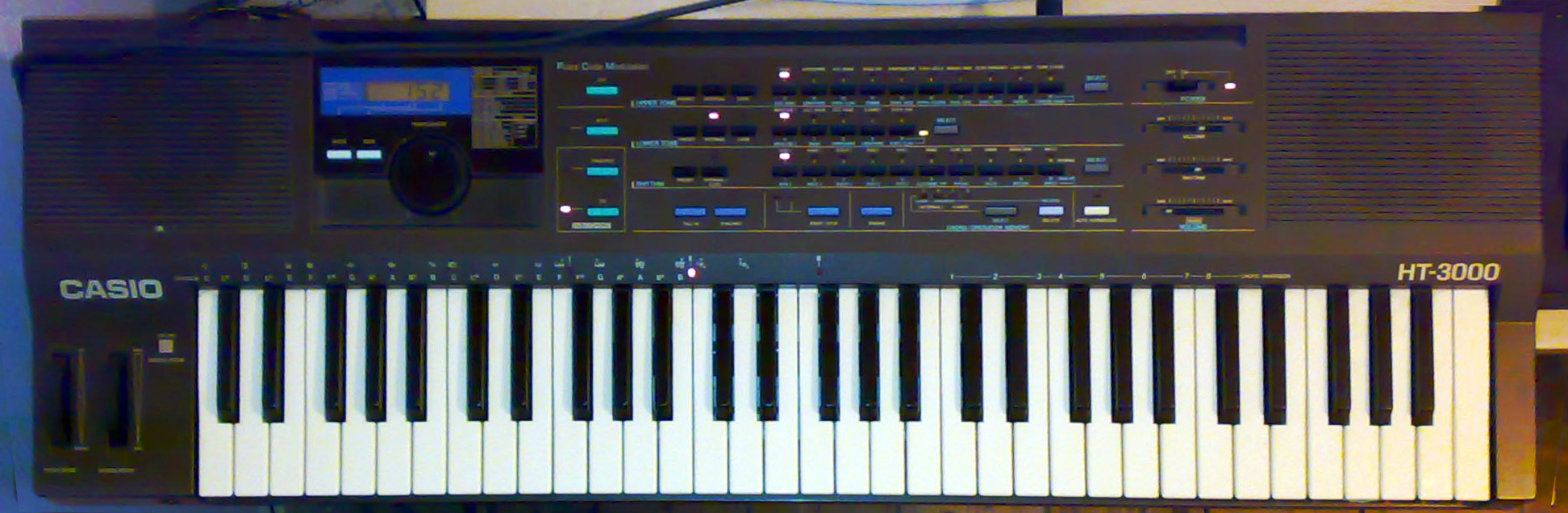
The Casio HT3000

=== HT-3000 ===
The HT-3000 was the full-size version of the HT-700. Like the HZ-600 (but in distinction from the MT-600 and HT-700), it had 61 full-size keys, a modulation wheel, a volume-pedal jack, MIDI THRU, and a 3-point splittable keyboard. Versus the HT-700, it also added a few other features such as an "Ending" for auto-rhythms, and "auto-harmonize." The HT-3000 was also sold by Hohner in Germany as the 'KS-61 Midi'.

=== HT-3500 ===
The HT-3500 was not released in North America. Details are unclear but it is not believed to be substantively different from the HT-3000.

=== HT-6000 ===
The HT-6000, released in late 1987 but not widely available until late 1988, was an entirely different SD synthesizer which greatly expanded SD as the synthesis engine. While designed as a consumer model, it was far more powerful than the more professional-appearing HZ-600 whose synthesis engine the other HT's utilized.

The HT-6000 introduced for the HT line some of the more high-end features previously only included by Casio in the CZ line, such as ring-modulation, detuning, key-follow, and initial-touch (which, among the CZ's, was only found on most advanced model, the CZ-1). The HT-6000 used an impressive 4 DCOs per voice (vs. 1 on the other SD synths, and 2 on the CZ synths). It had 64 DCO waveforms to choose from (32 basic, 16 with noise [white or metallic], and 16 with ring modulation). It had 8 independent VCF filters (1 per voice, vs. 1 per channel), and added key-follow parameters for both the DCA and VCF. The DCA also added attack and decay curves (acute and obtuse). It also added an independent ADSR envelope for noise.

The 4 DCOs each use the same waveform, VCF and DCA envelopes, but can have separate tunings, velocity response curves, and relative DCA envelope depths. Stacking the oscillators with detunes allowed the creation of flange and chorus effects, fat "super saws", and the creation of dual-note or even triad and 4-note leads. The filter cutoffs could be set to respond to velocity which added some expressiveness. Because each oscillator could have separate tuning and velocity responses, it was also possible to have the pitch change according to pressure, if one of two differently tuned oscillators had an inverse velocity curve. Ring modulation used oscillator 4 to modulate oscillator 3, and allowed the creation of metallic and pulse sounds, lower bass harmonics and even distortion.

Like the HZ-600 but unlike the others, the HT-6000 had a complete parameter list silkscreened on the outer panel, somewhat alleviating the need for a manual. In terms of "home keyboard" features the HT-6000 improved the auto-accompaniment versus the previous HT's by including some additional PCM drum sounds, an additional accompaniment part ("obbligato"), 4 bass patches (versus one), additional chord inversions (including more tonic, suspended and subdominant triads), and the addition of "Intro" and drum and chord "Variation" for auto-rhythms.

The HT-6000 was also sold in Germany by Hohner as the KS-610/TR. The HT-6000 was reviewed in Keyboard Magazine, November 1988, p. 149. If the HT-6000, rather than the HZ-600, had been packaged as the "professional" model, it may have sold much better.

== Feature Comparison Matrix ==
Casio SD Synth Features	HZ-600	MT-600	CT-630	HT-700	HT-3000	HT-6000
Keys	61 Full	49 Mini	61 Full	49 Mini	61 Full	61 Full
Built-in Speakers	No	Yes (1W+1W)	Yes (2W+2W)	Yes (1W+1W)	Yes (2W+2W)	Yes (2W+2W)
Velocity (Initial Touch) Sensitive	No	No	No	No	No	Yes
Polyphony	8	8	8	8	8	8
Multi-timbral MIDI Channels	2	3	3	3	3	4
Programmable SD Synthesis	Yes	No	No	Yes	Yes	Yes, Expanded
Headphones Jack	Front, 1/4"	Rear, 1/8"	Front, 1/4"	Rear, 1/8"	Front, 1/4"	Front, 1/4"
Volume Pedal/Sustain Jacks	Yes, 1/4" Stereo	No	Yes, 1/4" Stereo	Sustain only, 1/4"	Yes, 1/4" Stereo	Yes, 1/4" Stereo
Line-out Jacks	L & R 1/4"	None	L & R 1/4"	L & R RCA	L & R 1/4"	L & R 1/4"
MIDI Jacks	In, Out, Thru	In, Out	In, Out, Thru	In, Out	In, Out, Thru	In, Out, Thru
Transpose	-5 to +6	No	No	-5 to +6	-5 to +6	-5 to +6
Chorus	Analog, 3 levels	Analog, no levels	Analog, no levels	Analog, 3 levels	Analog, 3 levels	Analog, 3 levels
RAM Card Patch Capacity (Upper/Lower)	120 / 60	None	None	20 / 10	20 / 10	20 / 10
Accompaniment Sequencer Memory (Banks x Chords/Operations)	None	1x 1304/395	2x 640/198	2x 640/198	2x 640/198	2x 427/198
Pitch Bender Range	Selectable (Major 2nd, Minor 3rd, Perfect 5th)	Fixed @ Major 2nd	None	Fixed @ Major 2nd	Fixed @ Major 2nd	Fixed @ Major 2nd
Modulation Wheel	Yes	No	No	No	Yes	Yes
Programming Wheels	1	None	None	1	1	2
Auto-shutoff override	Yes	No	No	No	No	Yes
Keyboard Split	3 split points	None	3 split points	2 (only for auto-accompaniment)	3 split points	3 split points
Preset Patches	Piano, Harpsichord, Jazz Organ, Brass Ens, Symph Ens, Synth Bells, Magical Wind, Blues Harmonica, Light Harp, Plunk Extend, Elec Piano, Vibraphone, Synth Clavi, Strings, Synth Bass, Synth Celesta, Pearl Drop, Synth Reed, Fantasy, Typhoon Sound.	Piano 1, Elec Piano 1, Harpsichord, Vibraphone 1, Marimba, Brass Ens, Strings 1, Jazz Organ, Blues Harmonica, Violin, Synth Ens 1, Light Harp, Synth Vib 1, Synth Celesta, Synth Bass, Synth Reed, Pearl Drop, Magical Wind, Fantasy, Typhoon Sound.	Same as MT-600	Same as HZ-600	Same as HZ-600	Synth Ens 1, Cosmic Dance, String Ens, Brass Ens, Pipe Organ, Piano, Harpsichord, Guitar, Trumpet, Vibraphone, Synth Ens 2, Cathedral, Symphonic Ens, Synth Brass, Jazz Organ, Elec Piano, Harp, Funky Clavi, Flute, Synth Bells
"Internal" Patch Defaults (Rewritable except on the MT-600 and CT-630)	Piano 2, Marimba, Pipe Organ, Strings 2, Synth Ens 1, Synth Vib 1, Koto, Double Reed, Clarinet, Miracle, Elec Piano, Vibraphone 2, Violin, Synth Strings, Synth Ens 2, Synth Vib 2, Synth Harp, Slash Reed, Synth Guitar, Explosion	Piano 2, Elec Piano 2, Funky Clavi, Vibraphone 2, Koto, Symphonic Ens, Strings 2, Pipe Organ, Clarinet, Double Reed, Synth Ens 2, Synth Strings, Synth Vib 2, Synth Bells, Synth Guitar, Slash Reed, Synth Harp, Miracle, Plunk Extend, Explosion.	Same as MT-600	Same as HZ-600	Same as HZ-600	Synth Ens, Space Fantasy, Chorus, Synth Harp 1, Pipe Organ 2, Piano 2, Harpsichord 2, Harmonica, Synth Reed, Steel Drum, Brass Ens 2, Metallic Sound, Synth Sound, Fantasy, Jazz Organ 2, Synth Celesta, Synth Harp 2, Clarinet, Synth Guitar, Marimba
Auto accompaniment patterns	None	20 presets, non-programmable	20 presets, non-programmable	20 presets, 10 internal, +10 card	20 presets, 10 internal, +10 card	20 presets, 10 internal, +10 card
Volume Sliders	Master, Lower Tone	Master, Accompaniment	Master, Accompaniment, Drums	Master, Accompaniment, Drums	Master, Accompaniment/Lower Tone, Drums	Master, Accompaniment/Lower Tone, Drums
Accompaniment Parts	0 (No accompaniment)	2 (Chord, Bass)	2 (Chord, Bass)	2 (Chord, Bass)	2 (Chord, Bass)	3 (Chord, Bass, Obligatto)
Accompaniment Bass Patches	0 (No accompaniment)	1	1	1	1	4 (Wood, Elec, Slap, Synth)
Accompaniment Obligatto Patches	0 (No accompaniment)	0	0	0	0	6
Programmable PCM Percussion Sounds	0 (No accompaniment)	No programmable percussion. Preset rhythms use 8 of the HT-700/3000 drums. (bass, snare, rim-shot, elec. toms (hi, low), hi-hat (open, closed), and ride.) Has "Funk" and "Shuffle" presets instead of "Pops 2" and "Electronic Pop"	No programmable percussion. Preset rhythms use the 15 HT-700/3000 drums.	15 (bass, snare, rim-shot, elec. toms (hi, low), ride, claps, hi-hat (open, closed), bongos (hi, low), timbales (hi, low), agogos (hi, low), claps)	Same as HT-700	18 (same as HT-700/3000 but adds gated snare, timpani, orchestra hit, cowbell, and drops the claps.)
Chord Inversions available for Custom Accompaniment	0 (No accompaniment)	0 (Not programmable)	0 (Not programmable)	8	8	14
Rhythm Intro	No (No accompaniment)	No	No	No	No	Yes
Rhythm Ending	No (No accompaniment)	No	Yes	No	Yes	Yes
Rhythm Variation	No (No accompaniment)	No	No	No	No	Yes
Accompaniment Variation	No (No accompaniment)	No	No	No	No	Yes
Auto-Harmonize	No (No accompaniment)	No	Yes	No	Yes	Yes
DCO Oscillators/Voice	1	1	1	1	1	4 for upper tones, 2 for lower tones
Available DCO Waveforms	32 (Some including noise oscillation)	DCO-based presets uneditable.	DCO-based presets uneditable.	Same as HZ-600	Same as HZ-600	64 (32 basic, 16 including noise oscillation and 16 including ring modulation)
Programmable LFO Settings	Pitch only. Delay, speed, depth, wave (saw up/down, triangle, square, random)	None	None	Same as HZ-600	Same as HZ-600	Same as HZ-600
Programmable VCF Settings	ADSR w/ cutoff frequency, resonance, depth	None	None	Same as HZ-600	Same as HZ-600	ADSR w/ cutoff frequency, resonance, depth, key-follow, velocity curve
Number of VCF's	1 shared/channel	1 shared/channel	1 shared/channel	1 shared/channel	1 shared/channel	8 independent (1/voice of polyphony)
Programmable DCA Settings	ADSR, depth	None	None	Same as HZ-600	Same as HZ-600	ADSR, attack and decay curves (acute or obtuse), key-follow, plus velocity curves and depths for each of 4 oscillators
Independent DCA for Noise Oscillator	No	No	No	No	No	Yes (ADSR)
Detuning	No	No	No	No	No	Yes, higher than fundamental, fine or coarse (but not both together for a given oscillator)
Ring Modulation	No	No	No	No	No	Yes, oscillator 4 can modulate oscillator 3.
"Line Editor" Programming	No	No	No	No	No	Yes: simultaneous side-by-side view of all 4 oscillators' velocity, amplitude or detune, with 4 pairs of increment/decrement buttons.

== See also ==
- Casio
- Synthesizer
- Musical instrument
- Musical keyboard
- Casio CZ synthesizers
- Korg Poly-800
- Roland Alpha Juno
- Phase distortion synthesis
