= Vowel–consonant synthesis =

Type of sound synthesis used on Casiotone keyboards

Vowel–consonant synthesis is a type of hybrid digital–analogue synthesis developed and employed by the early Casiotone keyboards. It employs two digital waveforms, which are mixed and filtered by a static lowpass filter, with different filter positions selected for use according to presets. The filters are modeled on the frequencies present in the human vocal tract, hence the name given by Casio technicians during the research and development process.

The waveforms are stored and unalterable without considerable modification, such as the addition of a computer or microcontroller, to deliver alternative control data to the sound synthesis chip.
