= Casio 14 series =

Series of desk calculators

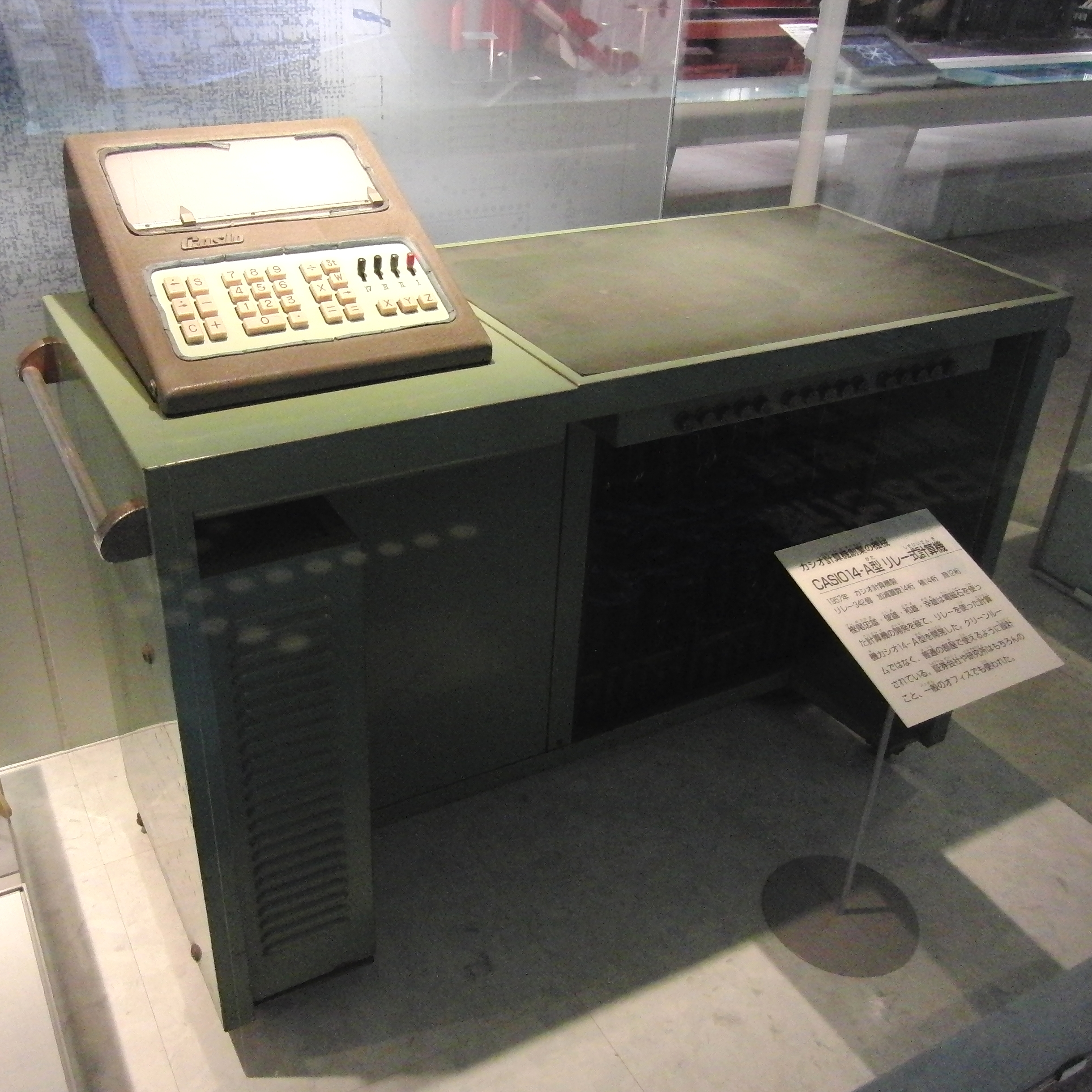
Casio 14-A

Casio 14 series is a series of electric desk calculators, the first ones ever made by Casio. The Casio 14-A, released in 1957, is the world's first movable electric calculator . It was capable of performing the four basic operations. It was discontinued in 1959 for Casio 14-B, capable of performing automatic addition and square root operations.

== History ==
Tadao Kashio developed the concept of the portable electric calculator while working together with his three brothers at his company Kashio Seisakujo, in Mitaka, Tokyo. His first prototype was done in 1954. In 1955 he and his brothers developed their tenth prototype, powered by solenoids, that was demonstrated at Bunshodo Corporation, in Tokyo. The company criticized the calculator for not being able to perform serial multiplications. Tadao then rebuilt it with 342 relays, and in 1956 he decided to unveil the new project at Taiyo Sales, Sapporo. But, when they arrived at the Haneda Airport, they were obligated to dismount the top part of the calculator as it exceeded the allowable size. It stopped working when reassembled so they made the presentation using slides only. Nevertheless, they managed to close a distribution contract with Uchida Yoko. At the time, Tadao and his brothers were already running a new company, called Casio Computer Co., and in June 1957 Casio 14-A was commercialized as the world's first compact all-electric calculator. It was named so as to indicate it was capable of performing operations up to 14 digits.

The calculator was popular among governmental offices, securities companies, and general affairs departments at ordinary companies. It has secured government funding and in 1958 received a prize from the president of Tokyo Hatsumei Kyosankai.

Casio 14-A was discontinued in September 1959. Its substitute, Casio 14-B, was capable of solving square root operations and was popular in colleges and technical research facilities.

== Casio 14-A ==
=== Design ===
Casio 14-A was designed to be similar to a table. It originally measured 1080 × 780 × 445 mm and weighed 140 kg, but its size and weight have changed with time. The calculator had 342 relays and operated on an 100 V power supply, consuming 300 W. It initially cost ¥485,000 and it was known for being faster and quieter than the competition.

=== Display ===
Display was done through an illuminating pad, where numbers were lit by miniature lamps according to the operation. It was capable of showing up to 14 digits on the same screen, something uncommon at a time.

=== Features ===
Casio 14-A was capable of performing the four basic operations: addition, subtraction, multiplication and division. Results could reach up to 14 digits. The calculator could also store 3 sets of 5-digit constants.

== Casio 14-B ==
=== Design ===
Casio 14-B measured 1080 x 445 x 780 mm and weighed 140 kg. It had about 350 relays and cost ¥650,000.

=== Display ===
Similar to Casio 14-A, it displayed results to 14 digits on a miniature lamp illuminated pad.

=== Features ===
Besides performing the four basic operations, it could also perform automatic summation and square root operations. It was capable of working with one constant of up to seven digits and storing two constants of up to five digits.
