= Casio =

Japanese electronics company

Casio Computer Co., Ltd.
- Logo used since 1972

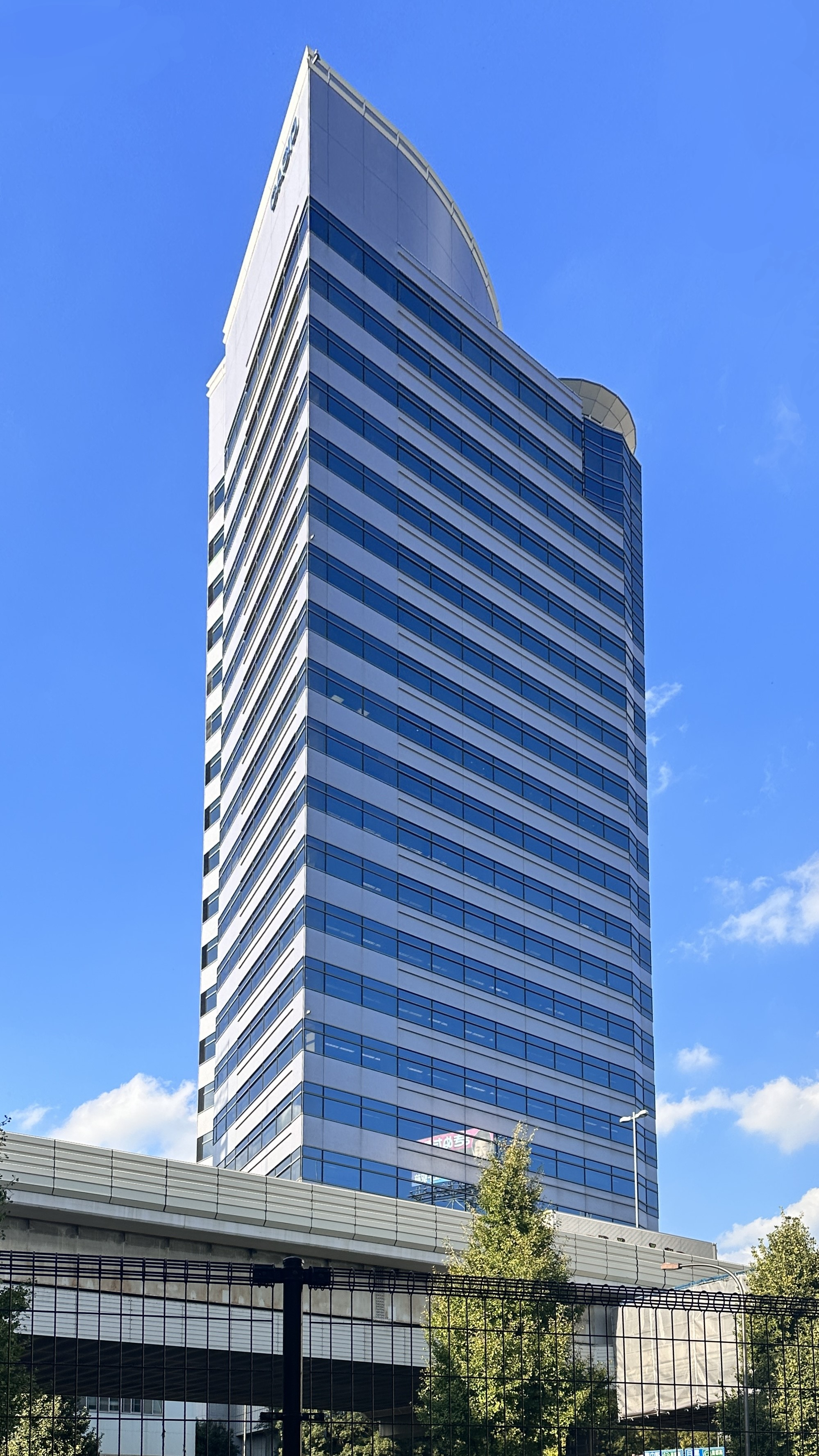
- Headquarters in Shibuya, Tokyo
- Native name: カシオ計算機株式会社
- Romanized name: Kashio Keisanki Kabushiki-gaisha
- Type: Public
- Traded as: TYO: 6952
- Industry: Electronics
- Founded: April 1946; 80 years ago (as Kashio Seisakujo); 1 June 1957; 69 years ago (as Casio Computer Co., Ltd.)
- Founders: Tadao Kashio; Toshio Kashio; Kazuo Kashio; Yukio Kashio
- Headquarters: Shibuya, Tokyo, Japan
- Area served: Worldwide
- Key people: Shin Takano (president and CEO)
- Products: Watches and clocks; Calculators; Electronic dictionaries; Label printers; Electronic musical instruments
- Revenue: ¥276.267 billion (FY2026)
- Operating income: ¥23.071 billion (FY2026)
- Net income: ¥18.227 billion (FY2026)
- Total assets: ¥351.475 billion (2026)
- Total equity: ¥235.163 billion (2026)
- Number of employees: 8,259 (2026)
- Website: world.casio.com

Casio Computer Co., Ltd. (Note: /ˈkæsioʊ/; Japanese pronunciation: [kaɕio].) (カシオ計算機株式会社, Kashio Keisanki Kabushiki-gaisha) is a Japanese multinational electronics manufacturer headquartered in Shibuya, Tokyo. Its principal products include watches, clocks, calculators, electronic dictionaries, label printers, and electronic musical instruments. In the fiscal year ended 31 March 2026, Casio reported consolidated net sales of ¥276.267 billion, of which ¥184.966 billion was generated by its Timepieces segment.

The business originated in 1946, when Tadao Kashio established the workshop Kashio Seisakujo. Casio Computer Co., Ltd. was incorporated in 1957 after Tadao and his younger brothers Toshio, Kazuo and Yukio developed the relay-based 14-A calculator. The Information Processing Society of Japan describes the 14-A as the first commercial relay-based calculator, while Casio describes it as the world's first compact all-electric calculator.

Casio subsequently expanded from office calculators into personal calculators, watches, electronic musical instruments and other consumer electronics. Products associated with its development include the Casio Mini calculator, the Casiotron digital watch, the G-Shock watch range, the Casiotone keyboard line and the QV-10 digital camera.

== History ==
=== Founding and calculators ===
Tadao Kashio, an engineer specializing in fabrication technology, established Kashio Seisakujo in Mitaka, Tokyo, in April 1946. The workshop initially undertook subcontracting work and manufactured items including microscope components and gears. Tadao's younger brothers Toshio, Kazuo and Yukio later joined the business.

According to Casio's corporate history, an early original product was the yubiwa pipe, a ring-mounted cigarette holder devised by Toshio Kashio. Revenue from the product helped finance the brothers' later development of calculating machines.

After seeing electrically powered calculating machines at a business exhibition in Tokyo in 1949, the brothers began developing a calculator of their own. A solenoid-based prototype was completed in 1954, but the design was subsequently rebuilt around telephone-exchange relays to improve its suitability for mass production.

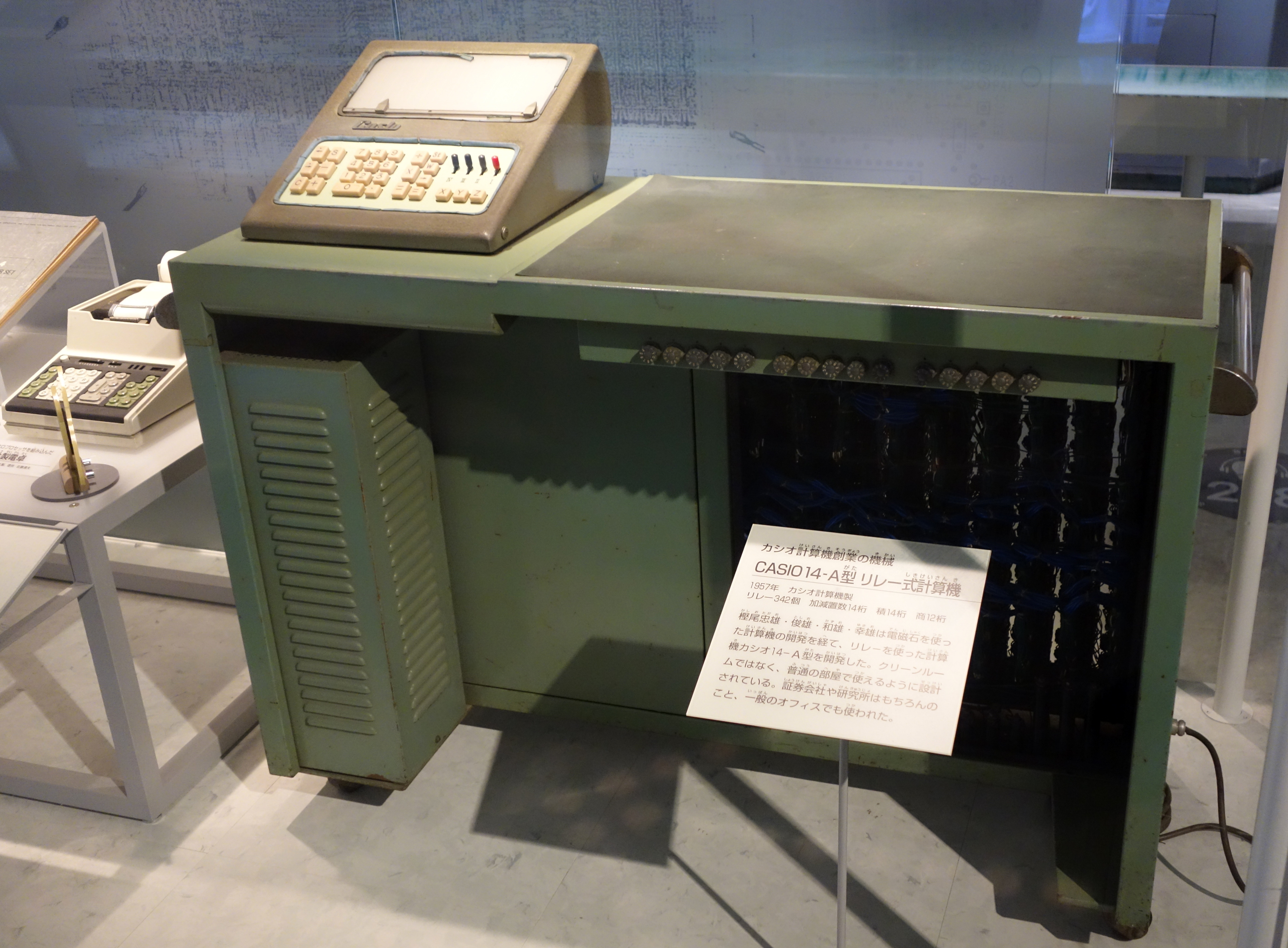
The relay-based Casio 14-A, released in 1957

In June 1957, the brothers released the 14-A. It could perform the four basic arithmetic operations with numbers of up to 14 digits and used a ten-key numerical keypad rather than the multi-column full keyboards then common on office calculating machines. It also used a single display window for both entered numbers and results.

The 14-A used 341 relays, although the Information Processing Society of Japan notes that the number varied slightly as the machine was revised. The society describes the machine as the first commercial relay-based calculator, while Casio describes it as the world's first compact all-electric calculator.

Casio Computer Co., Ltd. was established on 1 June 1957 to develop and manufacture relay calculators, with the brothers' father, Shigeru Kashio, serving as its first president. The company's Japanese name was initially written 樫尾計算機株式会社; in October 1960, the spelling of Kashio was changed from kanji to katakana, producing the present name カシオ計算機株式会社.

Casio introduced the 001, its first electronic desktop calculator, in 1965. It began exporting calculators to Australia in 1966 and opened a European office in Zürich the following year.

In August 1972, Casio released the Casio Mini, a six-digit calculator intended for personal use. It was priced at ¥12,800, approximately one-third of the price of competing products, and sold one million units in the ten months following its release. The Mini became a series whose cumulative sales exceeded ten million units.

Casio continued to develop scientific, programmable and graphing calculators. Later products included the FX-700P pocket computer and the fx-7000G graphing calculator, released in 1985.

=== Watches and electronic musical instruments ===
Casio entered the wristwatch market in November 1974 with the Casiotron QW02. The digital watch incorporated a calendar that automatically adjusted for months of different lengths. During the late 1970s and 1980s, Casio developed calculator watches and watches incorporating functions including games, telephone-number storage, world time and environmental sensors.

Casio engineer Kikuo Ibe proposed the development of a shock-resistant wristwatch in 1981. The project adopted the "Triple 10" objective of a ten-year battery life, water resistance to ten bar and survival after a ten-meter fall. The first G-Shock, the DW-5000C, was released in 1983.

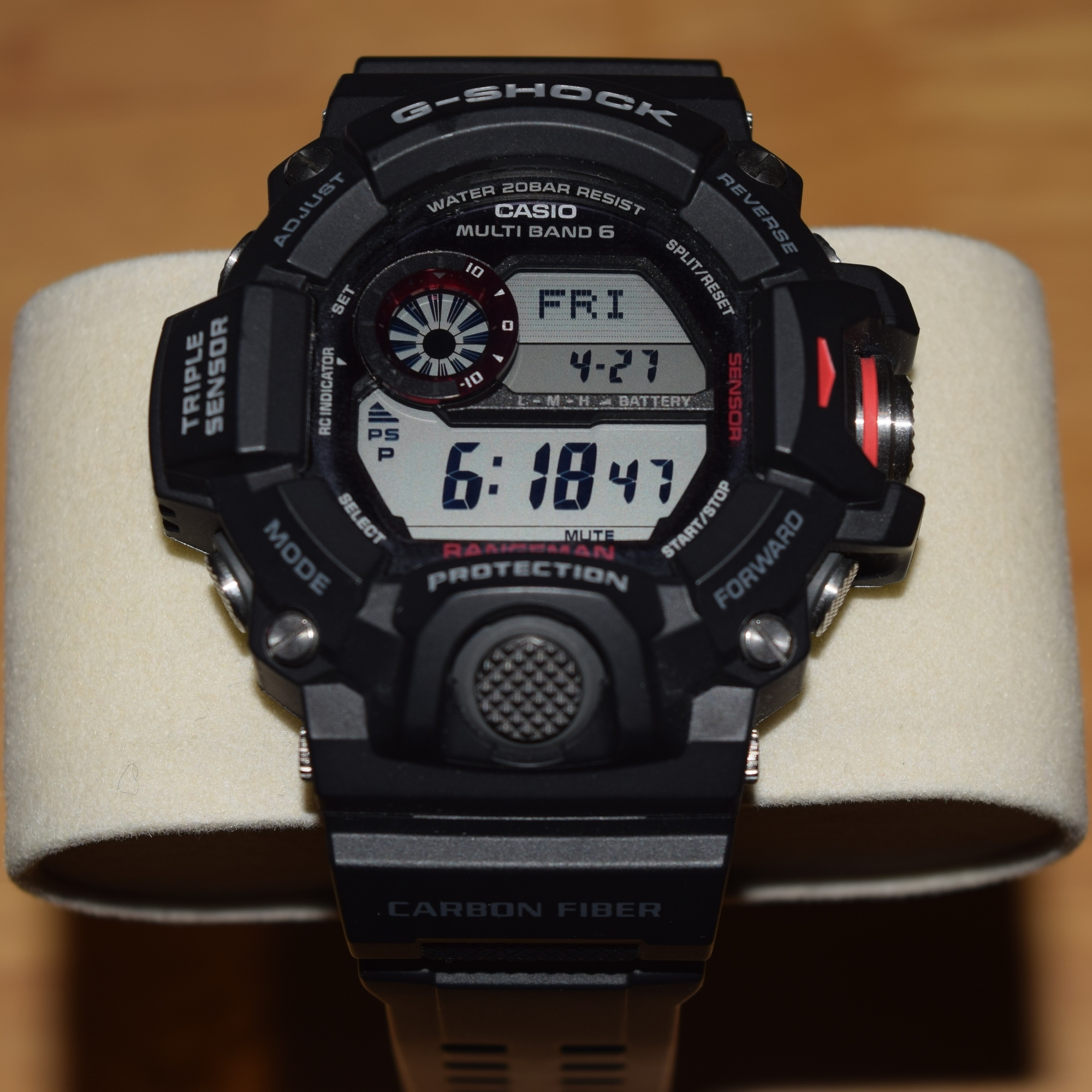
A later G-Shock Rangeman model

G-Shock developed into one of Casio's principal watch brands. Other Casio watch lines include Baby-G, Edifice, Oceanus and Pro Trek, as well as digital and analog watches sold under the Casio name.

Casio entered the electronic musical-instrument market in January 1980 with the Casiotone 201 keyboard. The instrument used a sound-generation system developed by Toshio Kashio called vowel–consonant synthesis that could reproduce 29 preset sounds, including keyboard, string and wind instruments.

The company subsequently released smaller keyboards, including the Casiotone MT-40 in 1981. A preset rhythm programmed by Hiroko Okuda was used as the basis of Wayne Smith's 1985 song "Under Mi Sleng Teng" and became widely used in digital dancehall music.

Casio later manufactured the VL-Tone series, CZ digital synthesizers, SK sampling keyboards, digital wind instruments and MIDI guitars. Its digital-piano lines include Privia and Celviano.

=== Personal electronics and digital imaging ===
During the 1980s and 1990s, Casio expanded into several categories of personal and office electronics. Its products included pocket computers, portable televisions, word processors, electronic organizers, handheld business terminals and electronic dictionaries.

In 1996, Casio released the CASSIOPEIA A-10 and A-11 handheld computers, which it had developed with Microsoft around the Windows CE operating system. Casio had previously produced electronic organizers and personal digital assistants, including the PF-3000, DK-1000 and Z-7000.

Casio entered the mobile-phone market in 2000 with the G'zOne C303CA, a water- and shock-resistant handset. The G'zOne name was subsequently used for a series of rugged mobile phones.

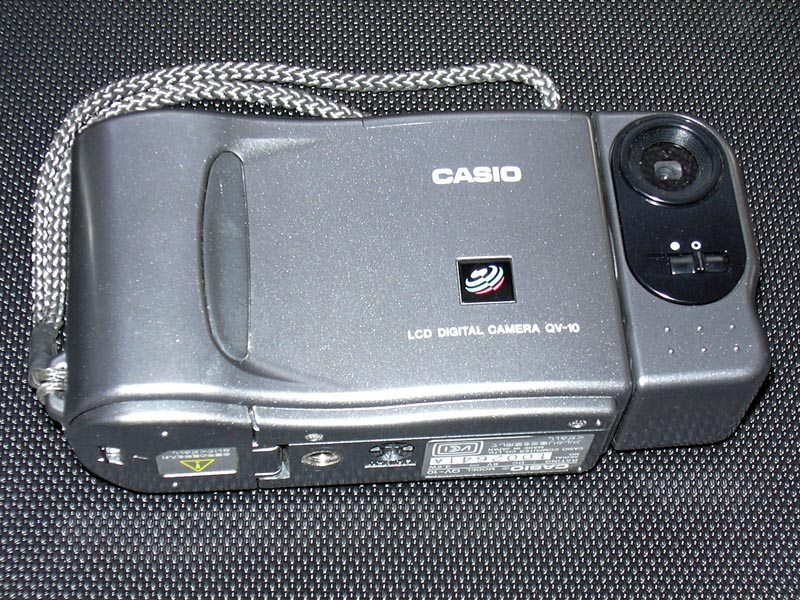
The QV-10, released in 1995, incorporated a rear LCD for composing and reviewing images.

In March 1995, Casio released the QV-10, the first consumer digital camera with an integrated liquid-crystal display that could be used both to compose photographs and review stored images. The National Museum of Nature and Science later designated the QV-10 an Essential Historical Material for Science and Technology.

Casio subsequently marketed compact digital cameras under the Exilim name. The EX-S1, introduced in 2002, was designed as a card-sized camera, while later Exilim models incorporated high-speed continuous shooting and image-processing functions.

Casio entered the page-printer market in 1985 and later marketed printers under the Speedia name. The company entered the business-projector market in 2003 and released the Green Slim XJ-A145 laser-and-LED projector in 2010.

=== Restructuring and recent developments ===
In 2016, Casio announced its withdrawal from the page-printer business; sales of the Speedia line subsequently ended.

Casio withdrew from the compact digital-camera market in 2018 following declining demand and continuing losses in the business.

In August 2019, the United Kingdom's Competition and Markets Authority fined Casio Electronics Co. Ltd. £3.7 million for resale price maintenance involving digital pianos and keyboards. Casio admitted that between 2013 and 2018 it had restricted retailers' ability to set online prices by requiring the products to be sold at or above specified minimum prices.

Casio later shifted its projection business away from conventional data projectors toward new applications using its projection technology, including embedded projection modules.

In October 2024, a ransomware attack disrupted Casio's computer systems and accounting processes, causing the company to postpone the release of its second-quarter financial results. The attack also affected product deliveries and exposed personal and confidential information held by the company.

Beginning in the fiscal year ending March 2025, Casio classified its handheld-terminal and electronic-cash-register operations, previously included in the System Equipment segment, as discontinued businesses within Others. From the fiscal year ended March 2026, the former System Equipment segment was incorporated into Others following the transfer of Casio's human-resources and small- and medium-sized business-support operations.

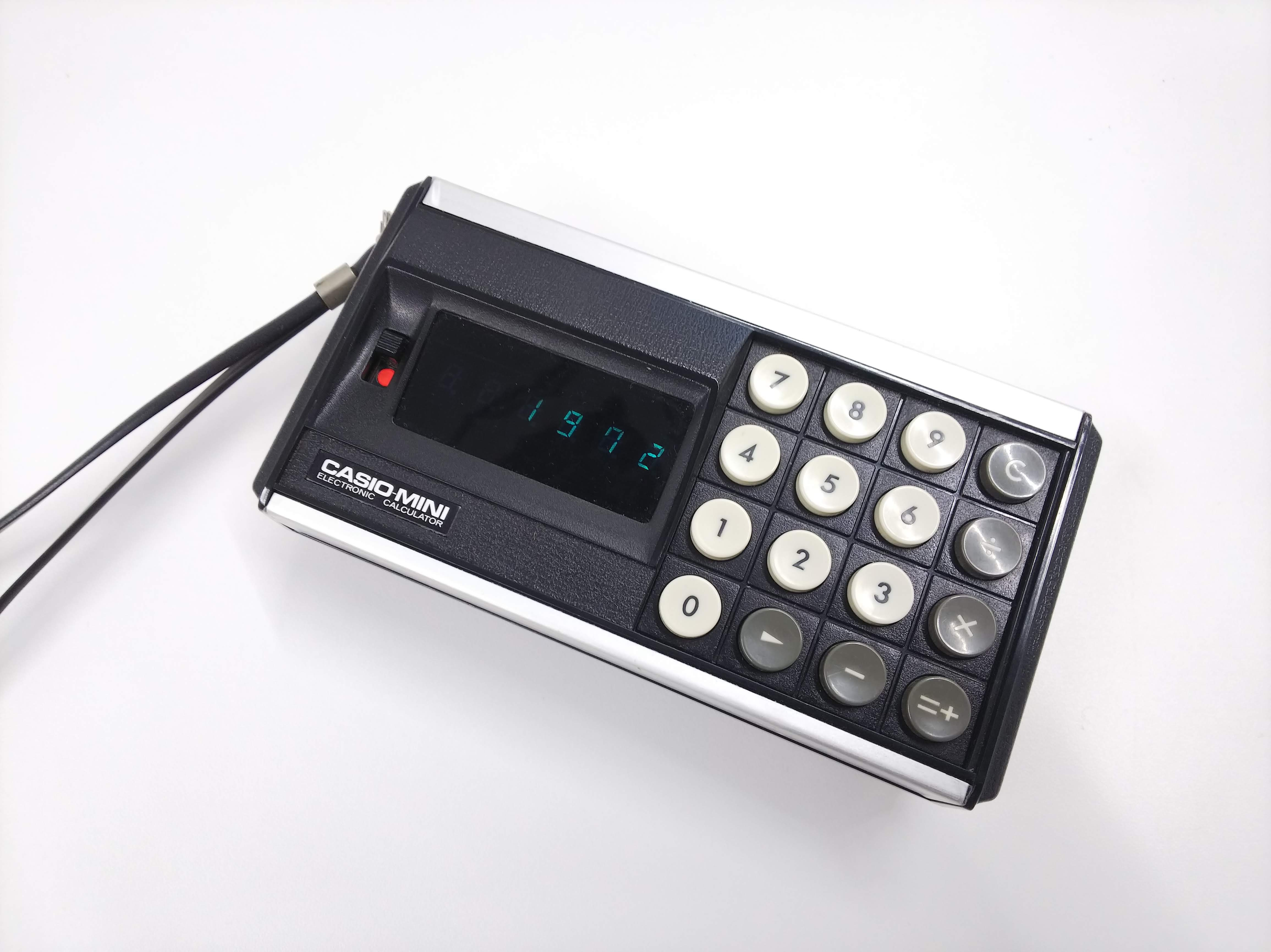
The Casio Mini, released in 1972, helped extend calculator use beyond offices.

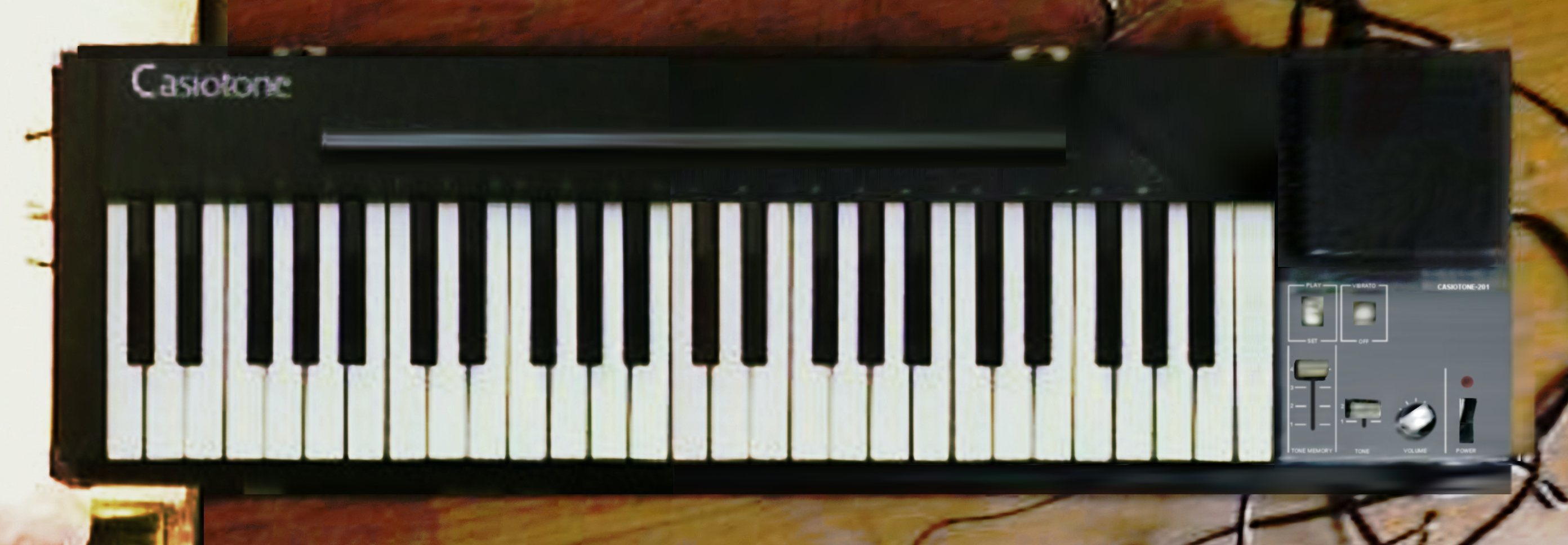
The Casiotone 201, Casio's first electronic musical instrument.

== Business operations ==
For the fiscal year ended 31 March 2026, Casio reported three business segments: Timepieces, Consumer and Others. Net sales to external customers were ¥184.966 billion in Timepieces, ¥82.057 billion in Consumer and ¥9.244 billion in Others.

=== Timepieces ===
The Timepieces segment manufactures wristwatches and clocks. Casio's watch brands include G-Shock and Baby-G shock-resistant watches, Edifice watches, Oceanus metal watches, Pro Trek outdoor watches and watches marketed under the Casio name.

Timepieces are Casio's largest business. In the fiscal year ended March 2026, the segment accounted for approximately 67 percent of consolidated net sales and recorded a segment profit of ¥27.125 billion before corporate-level adjustments.

=== Consumer products ===
The Consumer segment includes calculators, electronic dictionaries, label printers and electronic musical instruments.

Casio manufactures basic, scientific, financial, programmable and graphing calculators. Its educational products include ClassWiz scientific calculators, ClassPad graphing calculators and the ClassPad.net online learning service. The company also markets EX-word electronic dictionaries.

Its electronic musical instruments include Casiotone portable keyboards, Privia digital pianos, Celviano digital pianos, key-lighting keyboards and related applications.

Casio's label-printer products include the Name Land series in Japan and Label It! models in other markets. Some models can be operated from computers or smartphones.

=== Other activities ===
Casio operates smaller businesses in several additional fields. These include the Moflin AI companion device, hearing-assist earbuds, cameras for dermatological and gynecological examinations, and medical-imaging services.

The company's projection activities include compact embedded projection modules for manufacturing and construction applications and Foresight View smart-style projectors.

Under Casio's segment reporting, the Others segment includes molded components and dies, discontinued businesses and other activities.

== See also ==
- Casio F-91W
- Casio graphic calculators
- G-Shock
- Quartz crisis
