= Überzone =

- Also known as: Q, XOQ
- Born: Timothy Wiles; October 17, 1966 (age 59)
- Origin: Fullerton, California, U.S.
- Genres: Electronic, big beat
- Occupations: Musician, DJ, producer, engineer
- Instrument: Synthesizer
- Years active: 1995–present
- Labels: Nitrus Records, City of Angels, Astralwerks Records
- Website: http://www.uberzone.net/

Timothy Wiles, known by the stage name Überzone, is an electronic musician originally from Anaheim, California. He has also been known as Q, named after the popular character in the James Bond series.

Wiles is well known for concocting interesting gizmos and gadgets. He made a hobby out of collecting electronic music gear since his early teen years, which inspired his nickname. He has been an avid producer on the electronic music and breakbeat scenes since the mid-1990s, playing at early raves. His first show as Überzone was for DJ Sharpe at the Edge in Ft. Lauderdale, Florida. Wiles has produced many popular 12-inch singles which have appeared on many DJ compilation albums, including Botz, his first EP released on indie dance label City of Angels in 1995, and the Space Kadet EP the following year in 1996 (containing "Botz", "Moondusted", "The Brain" and others). In 1999, he collaborated with Afrika Bambaataa from Soul Sonic Force on the electro breaks driven anthem "2 Kool 4 Skool". He has also toured extensively with such acts as The Crystal Method. His debut album Faith in the Future was released on Astralwerks in 2001. Two mix CDs followed, 2002's The Digital Mix (Moonshine) and 2004's Uberzone Y4K (Distinctive Breaks). Wiles' latest album, Ideology, was released on Nitrus/Equation Records on July 31, 2007. He has also been featured in the documentary Better Living Through Circuitry.

Überzone's album Ideology was met with good reviews; in the September 2007 issue of DJ Magazine, it was rated 4½ stars. BijouBreaks.com said in July 2007: "Clearly pushing the boundaries and quality of electronic music to a whole new level. In a world where much EDM-oriented music is converging to a point where many producers are trying to achieve a similar sound or style, Uberzone has managed to shine and stand apart from the rest, while managing to keep things both superbly fun and definitely danceable."

== Instrument list ==
- Access Virus
- Korg Prophecy
- Moog Minimoog
- Moog Prodigy
- Roland CR-78
- Roland JP-8000
- Roland Juno-106
- Roland Jupiter-6
- Roland Jupiter-8
- Roland JX-8P
- Roland MKS-50
- Roland MKS-70
- Roland SH-101
- Roland TB-303
- Roland TR-606
- Roland TR-808
- Roland TR-909
- Roland VP-330
- Sequential Pro-One
- Sequential Six-Trak
- Waldorf Q
