= List of synthesizers =

The following is a list of notable synthesizers.

Year	Manufacturer	Synthesizer	Notes	Ref.
1963	Buchla	Buchla Model 100 Series		
1965	Moog Music	Moog synthesizer	First commercial synthesizer	
1970	Moog Music	Minimoog	First synthesizer sold in retail stores	
1970	Buchla	Buchla Series 200		
1978	Sequential Circuits	Prophet-5	First fully programmable polyphonic synthesizer	
2008	Dave Smith Instruments	Prophet '08		
2017	Dave Smith Instruments	Prophet Rev 2		
1983	Yamaha	DX7	First commercially successful digital synthesizer	
1987	Yamaha	DX7II		
1983	Yamaha	DX1		
1987	Yamaha	TX81Z		
1988	Yamaha	DX11		
1985	Yamaha	DX21		
1981	Roland	TB-303	Important to the development of acid house	
1982	Roland	SH-101		
1982	Roland	Juno-6 / Juno-60		
1981	Roland	Jupiter-8		
1983	Roland	Jupiter-6	First synthesizer with MIDI	
1983	Roland	JX-3P		
1984	Roland	Juno-106		
1985	Roland	Alpha Juno		
1987	Roland	D-50	First synthesizer with digital reverb	
1991	Roland	JD-800		
1981	Korg	Polysix		
1980	Oberheim	OB-Xa		
1988	Korg	M1	Bestselling synthesizer in history	
1990	Korg	Wavestation		
1979	Fairlight	Fairlight CMI		
1971	ARP	ARP 2600		
1972	ARP	ARP Odyssey	First duophonic synthesizer (capable of playing two notes at once)	
1975	Moog Music	Polymoog		
1969	EMS	VCS3		
1976	Yamaha	CS-80		
1978	Korg	MS-20		
1981	PPG	Wave		
1991	Korg	01/W		
1997	Propellerhead Software	ReBirth	One of the first software synthesizers that could be played in real time via MIDI	
1996	Roland	JP-8000	Supersaw technology helped popularise trance music.	
1980	New England Digital Corporation	Synclavier		
1984	E-mu Systems	Emulator II		
1984	Ensoniq	Mirage		
1984	Kurzweil Music Systems	Kurzweil K250		
1999	Elektron	SidStation		
2012	Elektron	Analog Four		
2018	Elektron	Digitone		
