= Roland Jupiter =

Roland Jupiter is a series of synthesizers produced by the Roland Corporation.

== List ==
Analog synths

- Roland Jupiter-4 (1978)
- Roland Jupiter-8 (1981)
- Roland Jupiter-6 (1983)
- Roland MKS-80 Super Jupiter (1984)

Digital synths

- Roland JP-8000 (1996) / JP-8080 (1998)
- Roland Jupiter-50 (2011)
- Roland Jupiter-80 (2011)
- Roland Jupiter-Xm (2019)
- Roland Jupiter-X (2020)

Software synths

- Roland Cloud Jupiter 8
