= Roland MKS-80 =

Polyphonic analog synthesizer

MKS-80 Super Jupiter
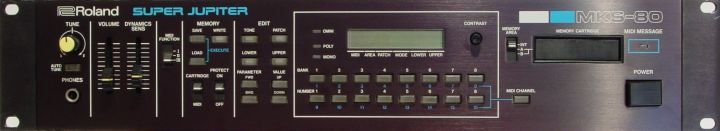
- MKS-80
- Manufacturer: Roland
- Dates: 1984–1987
- Price: US$2,495; UK£2,200; JP¥348,000

Technical specifications
- Polyphony: 8-voice
- Timbrality: 2 part
- Oscillator: 2 VCOs per voice
- LFO: 2 (1 triangle/square/sawtooth/random, and 1 triangle)
- Synthesis type: Analog Subtractive
- Filter: 24dB/Oct resonant lowpass, non-resonant highpass
- Attenuator: 2 ADSR, (VCA & VCF)
- Aftertouch expression: yes
- Velocity expression: yes
- Storage memory: 64 patches
- Effects: no

Input/output
- Keyboard: no
- External control: MIDI

The Roland MKS-80 Super Jupiter is a rack mount sound module version of the Roland Jupiter-6 and the Roland Jupiter-8 synthesizers. It is an 8-voice polyphonic analog synthesizer that was manufactured by Roland between 1984 and 1987. It is the only one of the MKS series of synthesizers to have analogue voltage-controlled oscillators (VCOs) instead of analogue digitally-controlled oscillators (DCOs). The voice architecture is almost identical to the Jupiter-6 synthesizer. The service manual states that "The module board of MKS-80 features the following in addition to that of JP-6, its brother module. 1) HPF. 2) Low boost circuit in the 2nd VCA. 3) DC supply current boost circuit (IC50)."

In February 1985, Roland started producing a new revision of MKS-80, known as "Rev 5", with a new generation of both Roland VCO's, VCA's and filter. The Rev 5 filter was also used in JX-8P, JX-10 and MKS-70 synthesizers.

== Features ==
The voice architecture of the MKS-80 is fully analog with 8 polyphonic voices with 2 voltage controlled oscillators (VCO) per voice, using the Curtis CEM3340 VCO integrated circuit. The unit also includes one voltage controlled filter (VCF) and one voltage controlled amplifier (VCA) per voice.

The MKS-80 has a 64 patch internal memory (8 banks of 8 patches each) along with an optional memory cartridge called the M-64C with room for another 128 (2 banks of 64 each). A full MIDI implementation is built into the MKS-80, with MIDI IN, OUT and THRU jacks positioned at the rear of the unit.

== External programmer ==
The MPG-80 is the optional programmer designed specifically for the MKS-80, providing direct access to the majority of the MKS-80's features. The MPG-80 connects to the MKS-80 via the Controller port using a special cable. When used with an MPG-80, the MKS-80's MIDI IN port is not used in favor of the MIDI IN on the MPG-80.

== Factory presets ==
The Factory Presets were created by Eric Persing and Dan Desousa.

== Notable users ==
- Andy Whitmore (Record Producer / Keyboard Player, London UK)
- Walter Afanasieff
- Blancmange
- John Carpenter
- Daft Punk
- Hans Zimmer
- Harold Faltermeyer
- Dave Grusin
- Herbie Hancock
- Klaus Schulze
- Tangerine Dream
- Madonna – bass in "Into the Groove", "La Isla Bonita", "Open Your Heart", "Who's That Girl"
- Vince Clarke
- Jonathan Cain of Journey used 2 of them for Raised on Radio
- Snap! (Luca Anzilotti a.k.a. John VIRGO Garrett III)
- Pet Shop Boys
- Enigma
- Michael Cretu
- Aphex Twin
- MSTRKRFT
- Talk Talk
- Orchestral Manoeuvres in the Dark
- Ulf Langheinrich
- Vangelis
- Mike Oldfield
- Ray Lynch
- Information Society
