= Elka Synthex =

Polyphonic analog synthesizer by Elka

Synthex
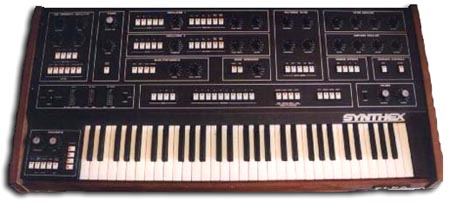
- Elka Synthex
- Manufacturer: Generalmusic (GEM, LEM, ELKA)
- Dates: 1981-1985
- Price: £2,500

Technical specifications
- Polyphony: 8
- Timbrality: 4
- Oscillator: 2 per voice + noise
- LFO: 2
- Synthesis type: Analog Subtractive
- Filter: Multi-mode, HP, LP, BP, resonance
- Attenuator: ADSR
- Storage memory: 40+40 locations
- Effects: Chorus, Ring Modulation

Input/output
- Keyboard: 61-key
- Left-hand control: Joystick
- External control: Custom interface / MIDI (late models); Foot switches (Advance, Glide, Hold, Release)

The Elka Synthex is a polyphonic analog synthesizer produced by Italian music instrument manufacturer Elka from 1981 to 1985.

== Overview ==
The Synthex was conceived and developed by independent Italian designer Mario Maggi, who then gained the financial backing of the Elka company of Italy, who produced the synthesizer from 1981 to 1985. Elka, a company more noted for its organs, had previously introduced their Rhapsody 490, 610 string machine, the monophonic Solist 505 and the big combo organ/synth X-705. A total of 1,850 units were produced. Today it is a highly sought-after instrument which recently reached quotations around 8,000 GBP (US$5414). It was succeeded by the Elka EK-22 (based on the CEM3396 chip which was also featured in e.g. Oberheim's Matrix line of synthesizers) and the Elka EK-44, which utilized their own version of FM synthesis, based on the Yamaha DX7.

== Features and architecture ==
The Synthex is an 8-voice analog synthesizer with 2 oscillators per note, separate envelope generators, and chorus. The use of stable digitally controlled oscillators (DGO) and oscillator cross pulse-width modulation and a multimode filter made it unique in its time. The Synthex is controlled by a Rockwell 6502P CPU. Unusually, the Synthex also contained a built in real-time and step-time 4-track monophonic sequencer with real-time transposition. The four different sequencer tracks can have different length and sounds (Upper/Lower can be allocated to different tracks). Also it is possible to insert rests between notes as well as length of notes. Sequences and patches could be dumped to analog cassette tape through an audio interface. Each of the eight voices has 2 DCOs with selectable waveform. The Synthex has three keyboard modes. 8 voice single sound (both Lower/Upper voices), Split with user selected split point (4 voices Lower/4 voices Upper) or Double which reduce the polyphony to four voices. Later versions implemented basic MIDI functions.

Instead of traditional pitch bend or modulation wheels, the Synthex employs a joystick which allows for greater variable real-time control over the two LFOs, oscillator and filter modulation. The 6 sliders beside the joystick assign what (LFO, osc and filter) goes to the joystick. Voices can also be layered or split across the keyboard. Other features include the onboard digital Ring-Modulator, Chorus effect and Dual or Layer modes available.

== Users ==
- Jean-Michel Jarre used the Synthex for the laser harp sound on his Rendez-Vous album.
- Geoff Downes of the band Asia used it on their album Astra.
- Stevie Wonder used the Synthex on his song "Skeletons".
- Martin Gore keyboardist of Depeche Mode used the Synthex on his solo album "MG". When interviewed on Keyboard Magazine he said: KM: "Was your rig exclusively modular or did you use any more conventional hardware synths?" MG: "I did use some more conventional stuff. I mean, I love my Elka Synthex".
- Nick Rhodes keyboardist of Duran Duran used the Synthex extensively on the album "All You Need Is Now". When interviewed on Keyboard Magazine he said: "On the song “Mediterranea”, there’s a sort of bubbling, arpeggiated track in the background. What was that created with? NR: That is actually a pulse. I pulsed it from a cowbell, sort of old school style, like I would have done on “Union of the Snake”, or “Is There Something I Should Know”, and it’s actually the Elka Synthex. There are a lot of layers of Synthex on that particular song—all the beautiful, soft bell tones. It’s particularly good for those". Rhodes also used the Synthex on various tracks and featured it in the trailer for the Duran Duran album "Paper Gods", according to his interview in Keyboard Magazine.
- Keith Emerson keyboardist of Emerson, Lake and Palmer used the Synthex as pictured and discussed during an interview in Electronics Music & Maker, 1985.
- Italian film composer Fabio Frizzi used a prototype Elka Synthex unit heavily in his soundtrack to Lucio Fulci's 1982 film Manhattan Baby.
- Italian film music composer Ivan Iusco used the Synthex on his albums Era Vulgaris and Synthagma.
