= Roland Jupiter-8 =

Synthesizer made by Roland in the 1980s

Jupiter-8
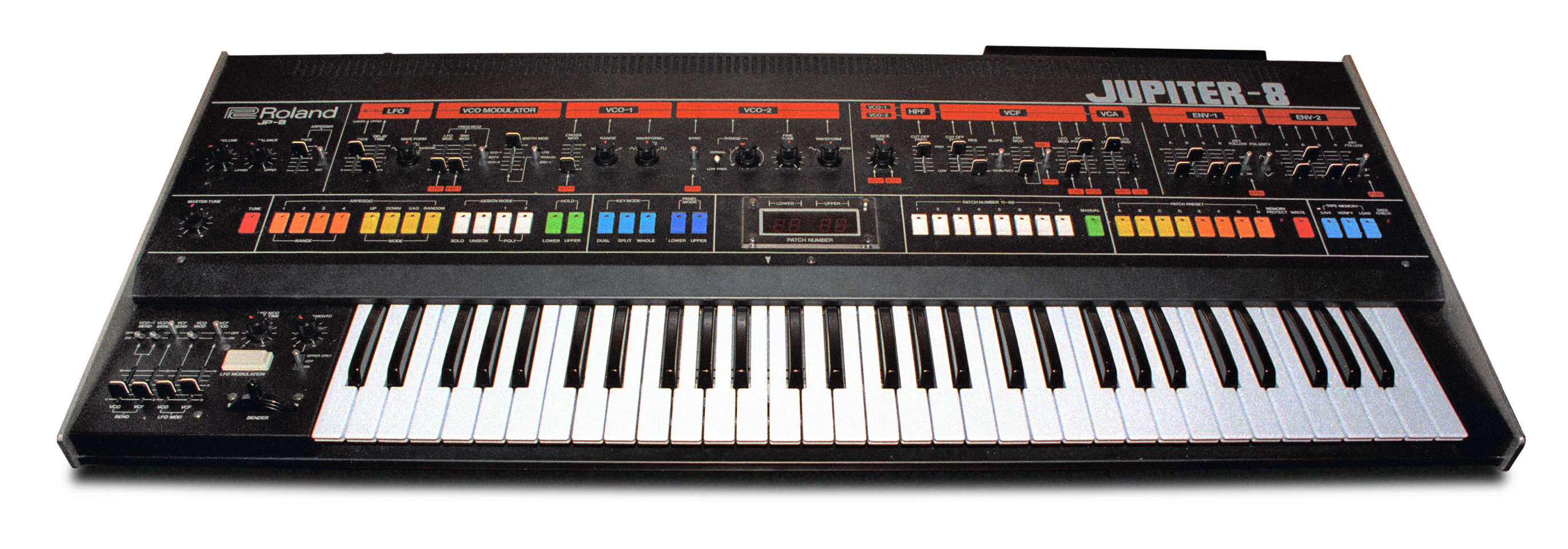
- Manufacturer: Roland Corporation
- Dates: 1981–1985
- Price: ¥980,000 JPY $5295 US £3995 GBP

Technical specifications
- Polyphony: 8 voices
- Timbrality: 2
- Oscillator: 2 VCOs per voice
- LFO: 1 triangle/square/sawtooth/random
- Synthesis type: analog subtractive
- Filter: 12 or 24 dB/octave resonant lowpass, non-resonant highpass 1 ADSR envelope for VCF
- Attenuator: 1 ADSR envelope for VCA
- Aftertouch expression: No
- Velocity expression: No
- Storage memory: 64 patches
- Effects: None

Input/output
- Keyboard: 61 keys
- External control: DCB (on later models)

The Jupiter-8, or JP-8, is an eight-voice polyphonic analog subtractive synthesizer introduced by Roland Corporation in early 1981.

The Jupiter-8 was Roland's flagship synthesizer for the first half of the 1980s. Approximately 3,300 units have been produced. Although it lacked the soon-to-be standard of MIDI control, later production series of the Jupiter-8 did include Roland's proprietary DCB interface. The instrument had many advanced features for its time, including the ability to split the keyboard into two zones, with separate patches active on each zone. Two years after the release of the Jupiter-8, Roland released the more affordable Jupiter-6 synthesizer with built-in MIDI control but an otherwise slightly reduced set of features.

In 2011, three decades after the release of the original Jupiter series, Roland released the fully digital Jupiter-80 and Jupiter-50 synthesizers as successors to the 1980s originals. They were in turn succeeded by the Jupiter-X and Jupiter-Xm in 2019. A Jupiter-8 plug-out was included already installed on the Roland System-8 synthesizer, in 2017.

== Features and architecture ==
The Jupiter-8 is an 8-voice polyphonic analog synthesizer. Each voice features two discrete VCOs with cross-modulation and sync, pulse-width modulation, a non-resonant high-pass filter, a resonant Low-pass filter with 2-pole (12 dB/octave) and 4-pole (24 dB/octave) settings, an LFO with variable waveforms and routings, and two envelope generators (one invertible).

Features include adjustable polyphonic portamento and a hold function for infinite sustain of notes and arpeggios. A versatile arpeggiator can be synchronized with external equipment by using the proprietary Roland DCB interface, clock input via CV jacks on the rear panel. An assignable bender can be used to control pitch or filter frequency.

The Jupiter-8 includes balanced XLR outputs as well as unbalanced 1/4" outputs for the ”Upper” and ”Lower” presets in Split mode. In addition to monophonic and polyphonic modes, the Jupiter-8 includes a unique polyphonic unison mode, in which all 16 oscillators can be stacked onto one note, but divide down if more keys are pressed. No other polyphonic synthesizer at the time had this feature.

A Zilog Z80 CPU was used for managing storage of patches, scanning the keyboard and front-panel controls for changes, displaying the current patch number and other information on the display and taking care of the auto-tune function, among other operations. The VCF was based on the custom Roland IR3109 IC (also used in the filter circuits of the Jupiter-6, later Jupiter-4 and Promars units, MKS-80 rev 4, Juno-6/Juno-60/Juno-106, SH-101, MC-202, JX-3P and packaged in the 80017a chip used in the Juno-106 and MKS-30, among others). The VCA was the BA662, used also in Juno-6/60/106, JX-3P and TB-303. The envelopes were generated in hardware by the Roland IR3R01 chip (also in the Juno 6/60), and are much faster (1ms attack) than the software-generated envelopes used in the later Jupiter-6, Juno-106 and MKS-80 "Super Jupiter".

== Reliability ==
There are claims that early models had unstable tuning, mainly due to DAC board resolution. Beginning with serial number 171700, the 12-bit DAC was upgraded to a 14-bit DAC. This increased the resolution of the CV voltages that control the analog circuitry. The soldered-in battery typically lasts ten years or more, ranking these boards among the lowest-maintenance of their generation.

== In the present day ==
The wide range of sounds that the Jupiter-8 can produce, the efficient front panel layout (each synthesizer sound parameter adjustment had its own dedicated controller), and its sturdy construction, make the Jupiter-8 a venerable and desirable instrument even 35 years after it was first produced. Units in good condition still fetch significantly more at auction than most new synthesizers, suggesting that the Jupiter-8 will continue to be heard for years to come. While the characteristic sound of the Jupiter-8 can be heard on many songs from the early 1980s onward, it is still being recorded to this day. For example, Alicia Keys can be seen playing one in the video for her number one hit "No One" from September 2007.

== Jupiter changes and successors ==
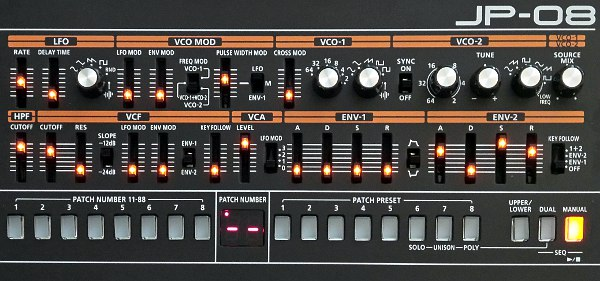
The Roland JP-08 copies the Jupiter-8 voice architecture

Throughout the production of the JP-8 there were several changes. Starting at serial #171700 the D/A converter on the Interface board was changed from 12-bit to 14-bit. This change was made mainly to improve tuning stability. The problem with the 12-bit digital-to-analog converter on the original JP-8 is that it could cause the autotune to be inaccurate in some instances. Some say to avoid these early JP-8's while others say they haven't experienced tuning problems. Starting at serial #242750 the LEDs of the display were changed to brighter ones. Starting at serial #282880 the JP-8 came standard with a DCB port. These newer JP-8's may be referred to as JP-8A's. DCB, or Digital Control Bus, was Roland's pre-MIDI interface that allowed the JP-8 to talk to other DCB enabled hardware, such as the Roland MC-4 and MC-8 microcomposers. Previous JP-8's had the option of having the OC-8 retrofit installed to give it DCB capability.

The Jupiter-6 was released 2 years after the JP-8 and was an attempt at a more affordable version of Roland's flagship. It features a similar voice architecture and appearance. It stored fewer patches, and had six voices. In order to make it cheaper to manufacture, Roland chose to utilize integrated circuits, as opposed to the discrete circuits used for JP-8's oscillators and amplifiers. The JP-6 is built using Curtis CEM3340 chips for its oscillators, and CEM3360 for its voltage controlled amplifiers. These changes imparted a change in sonic character, meaning that the JP-6 is not simply a less-expensive version of the JP-8, but an instrument with its own distinct sound. Additionally, the Jupiter-6 features a true multimode resonant filter, built-in MIDI, unison detune function and the ability to activate multiple waveforms on a single oscillator.

The Roland MKS-80 Super Jupiter is a MIDI-controlled, rack-mountable sound module with a similar voice architecture to the Jupiter-8. However, its first released incarnation in 1984 (revision 3 and 4) used hardware similar to its predecessor, the Jupiter-6 (which had a combination of Curtis VCO and VCA chips combined with Roland's own proprietary filters). In 1985, Roland released another revision of the MKS-80, known as Rev 5, which used different VCO, VCA and filter circuits. As a result, the MKS-80 Rev 5 can sound a bit different from its predecessors. The Rev 5 filter was also used in the JX-8P, JX-10 and MKS-70 synthesizers.

At the 2007 NAMM show, French music software manufacturer Arturia announced, and subsequently released a software Jupiter-8 called Jupiter-8V. A 2007 review in Sound on Sound stated, "8V sounds much like Jupiter 8, but does a zillion things that the original could not." The Jupiter-8V is available in VST, AU, RTAS and AAX plugin formats.

The Roland VariOS provides a mildly successful digital approximation of the Jupiter-8 using its "Varios-8" software.

In 2011, Roland released the JUPITER-80 and JUPITER-50, which inherit much of the visual style of the Jupiter-8 and include Roland's SuperNATURAL, an extensive synthesis engine that includes virtual analog synthesis akin to a digital recreation of earlier Roland analog synths, as well as PCM-based recreations of purely digital synths by the company and acoustic modelling of real instruments. Emulations of the original Jupiter-8 sounds were later released as a software instrument for both keyboards on Roland Axial as part of the Synth Legends series.

On October 1, 2015, Roland released the Boutique line of compact synthesizers, which includes the JP-08 unit which has the same parameters and sound design as the Roland Jupiter-8. It uses Roland's ACB technology (Analog Circuit Behavior), which emulates the behavior of each single component of the original Jupiter-8 circuit. However, the JP-08 has only half the polyphony of the Jupiter-8, with 4 voices. An evolution of the JP-08, closer to the original Jupiter-8 with 8 voices, was released in 2017 as plug-out synthesizer bundled as standard with the SYSTEM-8.

In 2019, Roland released the Jupiter-X and Jupiter-Xm.

In 2021, Black Corporation announced their ISE-NIN synthesizer, which is based on and inspired by the Jupiter-8.

In late 2024, Behringer released the JT Mini, a compact clone of the Jupiter-8. Later at NAMM 2025, they revealed the prototype of the new Jupiter-8 clone, JT-16.

In 2026, Roland released a revised version of the JP-08 unit, renamed the Jupiter-08, in honor of the original Jupiter-8's 45th anniversary. The default polyphony was upgraded to 8 voices as in the original Jupiter-8, and the maximum polyphony now adjustable to 32 voices.

== Notable users ==
Notable users of the Roland Jupiter-8.

In alphabetical order (by given name or group name):

- ABBA
- Damon Albarn
- BT
- Jonathan Cain of Journey, most notably on the song "Separate Ways"
- Vince Clarke
- Duran Duran - "Hungry Like the Wolf", "Save A Prayer"
  - "Rio" is also said to feature the Jupiter-8, but it was actually the Roland Jupiter-4 with its arpeggiator in random mode.
- Marvin Gaye - the Jupiter 8 and the TR-808 were the primary tools on his 1982 album, Midnight Love.
- Ilaiyaraaja - Punnagai Mannan
- Michael Jackson - Thriller
- Nero
- Howard Jones
- Giorgio Moroder
- Orchestral Manoeuvres in the Dark - Junk Culture
- Pet Shop Boys - Behaviour
- Queen - albums Hot Space, The Works, and A Kind of Magic
- Andy Richards – song Relax by Frankie Goes to Hollywood
- Charanjit Singh - Synthesizing: Ten Ragas to a Disco Beat

- Sparks - keyboardist Ron Mael notably rearranged the letters on the front-facing Roland logo to read "Ronald."
- Tangerine Dream - Poland (Note: Tangerine Dream. Poland (inner sleeve of record two). Tangerine Dream. Jive Electro. 1984. HIP 22. "On this record the following stage equipment was used: Christoph Franke: [Prophet 5, Prophet 600, Prophet 1, E-mu Emulator, E-mu Custom Programmable Synth, Moog Custom Programmable Synth, MTI Synthergy, PE Polyrhythmic Sequencer, Compulab Digital Sequencer, Syntec Custom Digital Drum Computer, Simmons, Drum Modules, Quantec Room Simulator, Roland SDE 3000, Hill Multi-Mixer], Edgar Froese: [Yamaha DX7, Yamaha YP30, Jupiter 8, Jupiter 6, Prophet 5, PPG Wave 2.2, PE Polyrhythmic Sequencer, EEH CM 4 Digital Sequencer, DMX Oberheim Digital Drums, PE Custom Trigger Selector, Publison DHM 89 B2, Publison KB 2000, Korg SDD 3000 Delay, Roland SDE MIDI/DCB Interfaces, Quantec Room Simulator, Canproduct Mixer]. Johannes Schmoelling: [Jupiter 8, PPG Wave 2.3 Waveterm, EEH CM 4 Digital Sequencer, Bohm Digital Drums, Roland TR 808 Drums, Mini Moog, Korg MonoPoly, Roland SDE 3000 Delay, Canproduct Mixer, MXR 01 Digital Reverb, MXR Digital Delay, Boss Overdrive/Flanger].")
- Tears for Fears
- Ultravox
