= Roland Zenology =

Synthesizer

- Manufacturer: Roland
- Dates: 2020-

Technical specifications
- Timbrality: 1-part (4 partials; multiple instances may be layered in DAW)
- Synthesis type: Sample-based synthesis, PCM synthesis, analog modeling synthesis

Input/output
- Keyboard: MIDI (not included)
- External control: MIDI

The Roland Zenology was initially released in May 2020 as a rackmount-style softsynth built on the ZEN-Core engine which powers the Jupiter-X and Fantom. It has been expanded to provide full control panels for specific 'Model Expansions'. It initially came with 3,597 presets, expandable through many themed preset packs. These are now fully editable in Zenology Pro. Roland has, for example, released an expansion that models the Roland JX-8P, providing a full control panel with similar access to parameters as provided by the JX-8P's PG-800 programmer. Two or more instances of Zenology can be layered, effectively providing the functionality of a Roland JX-10.
