= Roland JX-8P =

1984 polyphonic analog synthesizer

JX-8P
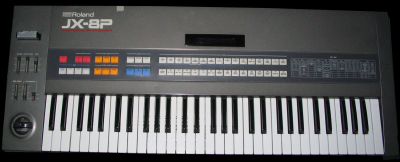
- Manufacturer: Roland
- Dates: 1985-1989
- Price: US$1,695; UK£1,165; JP¥228,000

Technical specifications
- Polyphony: 6 voices
- Timbrality: Monotimbral
- Oscillator: 2 DCOs per voice (pulse, saw, square and noise)
- LFO: 1 sine/square/random with delay and rate
- Synthesis type: Analog subtractive
- Filter: 24dB/oct resonant low-pass, non-resonant high-pass
- Attenuator: 2 ADSR
- Aftertouch expression: Yes
- Velocity expression: Yes
- Storage memory: 64 preset patches/32 user patches
- Effects: Chorus

Input/output
- Keyboard: 61 notes
- External control: MIDI

Roland JX-8P is a 61-key, velocity- and aftertouch-sensitive, six-note polyphonic, almost entirely analog synthesizer released by Roland in 1985. In a time of rising popularity of digital frequency modulation synthesizers, such as Yamaha DX7, JX-8P was marketed as the best of both worlds: while it was possible to create classic analog synth sounds, several new modulation parameters and redesigned hardware enabled it to produce certain types of sounds associated with FM synthesis, such as metallic percussive sounds. Likewise, traditional hands-on controls were replaced with a Yamaha DX7-style interface with membrane buttons and one "edit" slider.

The forerunners to the JX-8P were the JX-3P and the rack MKS-30. JX-8P was among the first hybrid analog synthesizers produced by Roland in the 1980s, with Alpha Juno 1/2 synths, racks MKS-50 and Roland MKS-70, and finally the JX-10.

Factory presets on the JX-8P were created by Eric Persing and Dan DeSouza.

One of the JX-8P's best known uses is in the opening brass fanfare of Europe's 1986 hit "The Final Countdown", layered with a preset patch on a Yamaha TX816.

== Features and programming ==
Though the JX-8P is relatively complex, it may appear otherwise for its lack of traditional synthesizer controls. It features two DCOs per voice, two software-generated (and relatively soft) ADSR envelopes, high- and low-pass filters, two types of (fixed-rate) chorus effect, three different sync modes, etc. Additionally, it offers two "polyphonic" play modes, two "unison", and two "solo" modes, one of which stacks all its oscillators into a single monophonic sound. Further, the synth's MIDI specification is surprisingly polished for an instrument of this vintage (unlike most earlier Roland synths, and even its direct successor, JX-10).

Programming is achieved either by means of one "edit" slider and a table of parameters for selection by number input, or by means of a separate unit, the Roland PG-800 programmer. All parameters are available without the programmer, but editing with the data slider requires patience, and it is severely limited for live tweaking as only one control can be accessed at a time. The PG-800 provides dedicated slider controls for most parameters and fits comfortably onto the synthesizer. The PG-800 connects to the JX-8P via a dedicated port, with a proprietary 6-pin DIN cable. The programmer unit had to be purchased separately, and due to relative rarity, nowadays a second-hand PG-800 unit would ordinarily cost more than the synthesizer itself. However, with recent advances in technology, adapters can be used to turn most tablets into virtual PG-800 programmers.

Most of its synthesis parameters can be accessed via system-exclusive (sysex) MIDI messages from a third-party hardware MIDI controller, or computer software over standard MIDI ports.

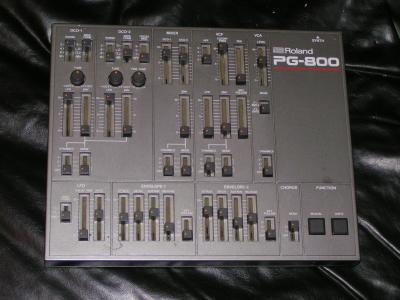
PG-800 Synthesizer Programmer.

== Memory ==
JX-8P's sound presets are organized into two banks, with 32 sounds each. Additionally, users can store 32 custom sounds in its internal memory, and 32 more in the optional M-16C cartridge. Patches can also be imported and exported via system-exclusive (sysex) MIDI messages. Patches are compatible with Roland JX-10 and Roland MKS-70 synthesizers.

== See also ==
- Roland JX-10
