= Oberheim Matrix synthesizers =

Series of analog synthesizers

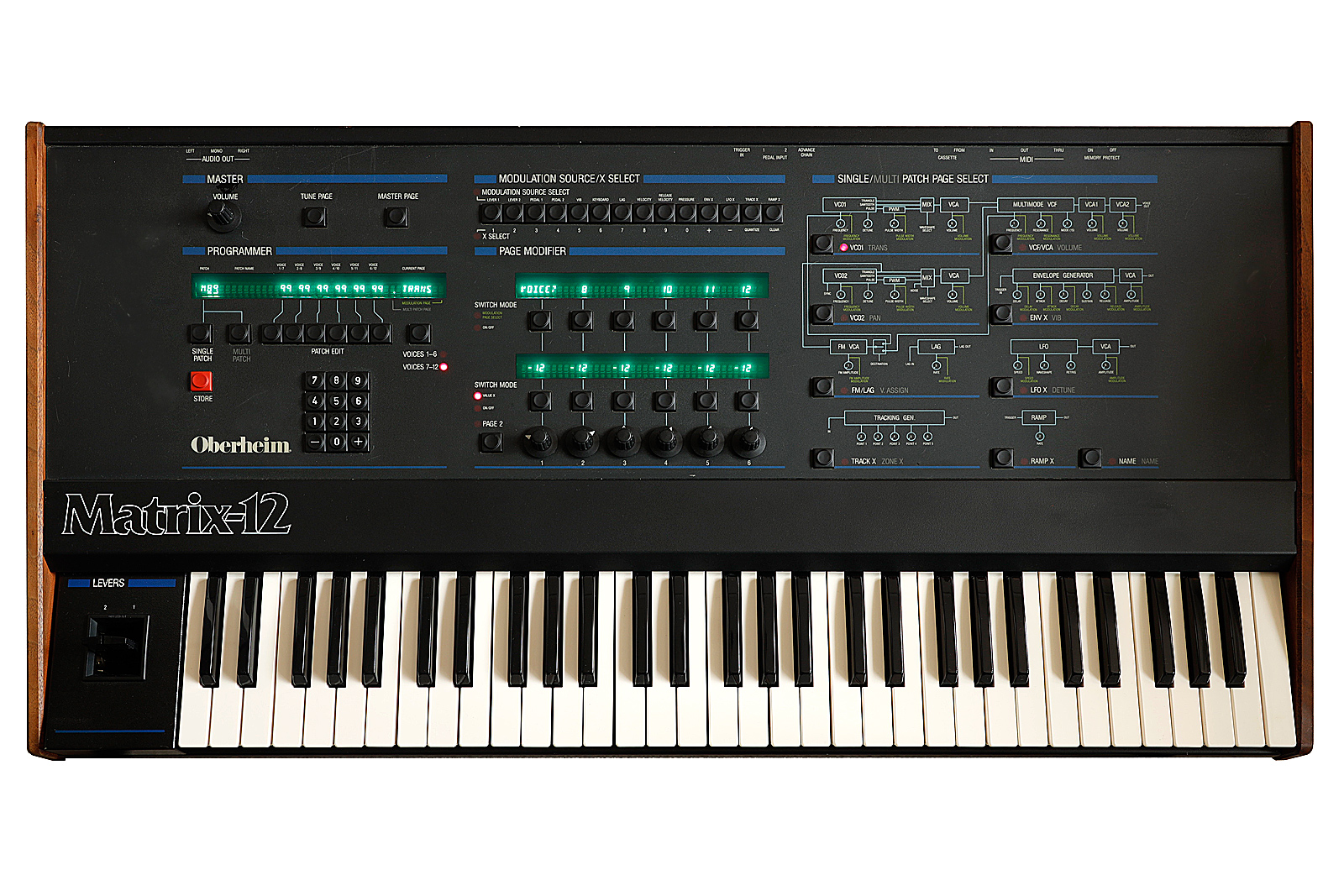
Oberheim Matrix-12 (1985–1988)

Oberheim Matrix synthesizers were a product line of subtractive analog synthesizers from Oberheim featuring a system of modulation which Oberheim called "Matrix Modulation" as a method of selecting and routing elements that dynamically shape various aspects of the sounds it produces. Matrix synthesizers continue to be popular due to their characteristic late-1980s analog sound and leading patching and filter capabilities.

These five products fall into two groups. The Xpander is a six-voice rack-mount synthesizer with voltage-controlled oscillators and very flexible voltage-controlled filters. The Matrix-12 is in effect two Xpanders plus a keyboard. The second group consists of the Matrix-6 synthesizer, with DCOs, and much more standard filter capability. It had two rack-mount variants, the Matrix-6R (Matrix-6 without keyboard) and the Matrix-1000 (low cost preset version with extended memory).

== Models ==
	Xpander	Matrix-12	Matrix-6	Matrix-6R	Matrix-1000
Image(s)		Oberheim Matrix-12 synthesizer top view with background erased.			
Polyphony	6 voices	12 voices	6 voices		
Oscillators	12 VCOs (2 per voice) featuring CEM3374	24 VCOs (2 per voice) featuring CEM3374	12 DCOs (2 per voice) featuring CEM3396		
Filter	Multimode, 15 variations of low / high / band / notch / phase shift resonant filter based on CEM 3372 w/ external switch circuitry		low-pass filter using CEM3396's LPF		same as 6R but different capacitors
LFO	5 (per voice) (plus 1 global for vibrato effect)		2 (per voice) (plus 1 global for vibrato effect)		
Envelopes	5 (per voice)		3 (per voice)		
Layers	6-part multitimbral with up to 6 zones	12-part multitimbral with up to 6 zones	2-part multitimbral with up to 2 zones		monotimbral
Memory	100 patches, 100 multi		100 patches, 50 multi		1000 patches (800 preset, 200 user)
Form Factor	Desktop	61-key (velocity & channel aftertouch)		Rackmount	
Production	1984–1988	1985–1988	1985–1988	1986–1988	1988–1994
Price	US$3995	US$6399	US$1695	US$999	US$599
