= Casio CTK-2080 =

Music workstation

Casio CTK-2080 VK3
- Manufacturer: Casio
- Price: MSRP:??? US

Technical specifications
- Polyphony: 48 notes
- Timbrality: 16 parts
- Synthesis type: Analog Subtractive
- Effects: Reverb, Sustain, Pitch Bend, Transpose

Input/output

The Casio CTK-2080 VK3 is a polyphonic electronic keyboard workstation manufactured by Casio Computer Co., Ltd. As an installment in the long-running CTK series, the keyboard is primarily intended for entry-level keyboard players.

== Architecture ==
The Casio CTK-2080 has pressure-sensitive features, an LCD, 400 different tones that can be altered by various effects settings, a metronome, and 110 built-in songs. The keyboard also supports both MIDI and USB ports, allowing connection to computers, as well as other instruments. The keyboard can also digitally sample external sounds.

== See also ==
List of Casio Musical Instruments
