= Prophet '08 =

Synthesizer

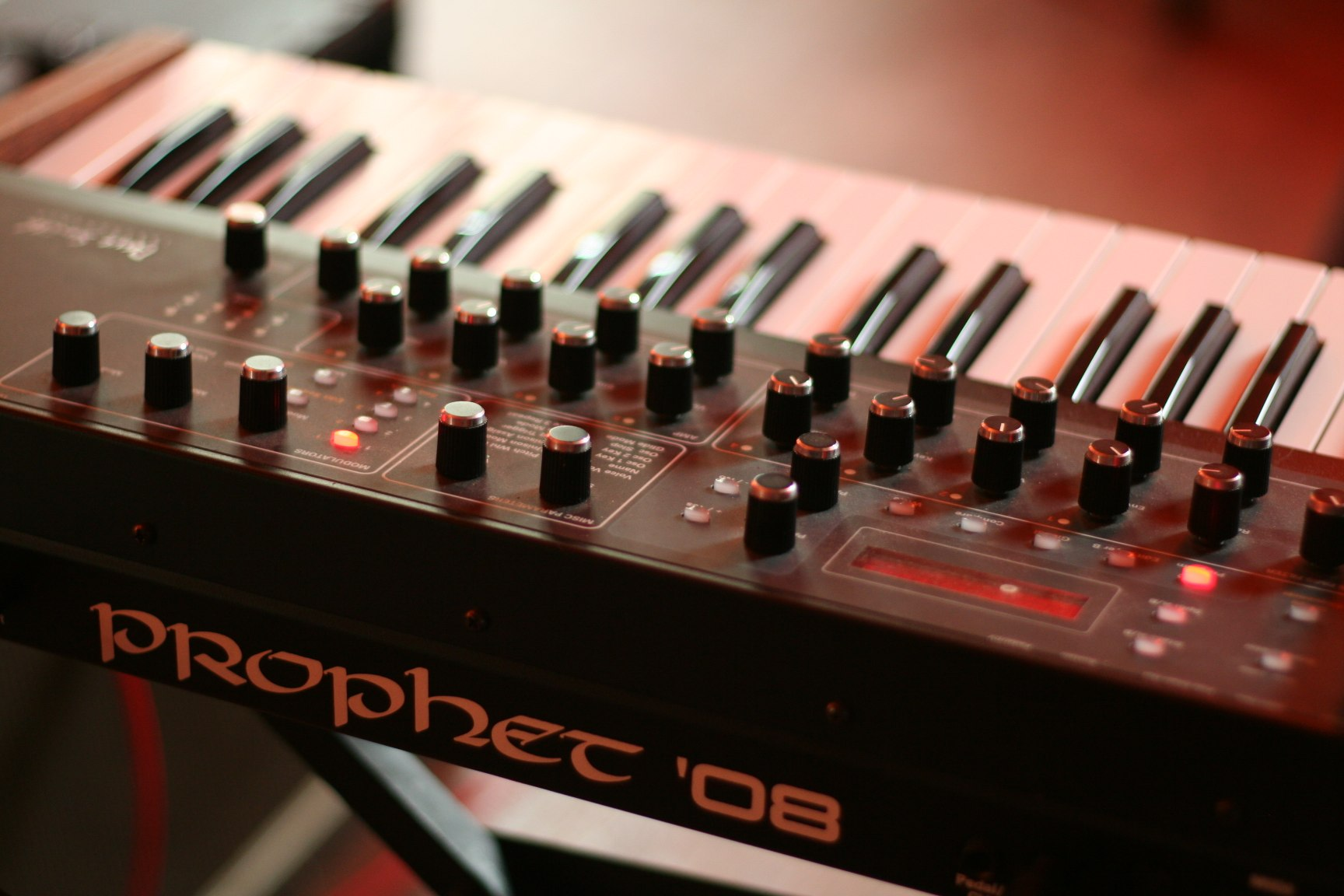
- Manufacturer: Dave Smith Instruments
- Dates: August 20, 2007-2016
- Price: £1499 GBP $2000 US

Technical specifications
- Polyphony: 8 voice
- Oscillator: 2 DCOs per voice
- LFO: 4 total
- Synthesis type: Subtractive synthesis
- Filter: Analog low pass (resonant 4-pole or 2-pole)
- Effects: None

Input/output
- Keyboard: 5 octave, C to C

The Prophet '08 is a polyphonic analog synthesizer released by Dave Smith Instruments (DSI) in 2007. As with DSI's other instruments, the Prophet '08 uses analog subtractive synthesis. Similar in functionality to the renowned Sequential Circuits Prophet-5 popularized in the 1970s (also designed by Dave Smith), the Prophet '08 has an all analog signal path; however its envelopes are generated digitally.

In 2017, the Prophet '08 was superseded by the Prophet Rev2, which is available in 8-voice and 16-voice versions as well as keyboard and module variants. The Prophet Rev2 added waveshape modulation, improved onboard effects, a sub oscillator and a polyphonic sequencer.

== Sound architecture ==
The Prophet '08 is an eight-voice analog synthesizer featuring all-analog audio paths with digital parameter control. It offers three playing modes: uniform eight-voice, a split mode dividing the keyboard between two different sounds, and a stacked mode for layered four-voice textures.

Each voice includes two digitally controlled oscillators (DCOs), a voltage-controlled filter (VCF), a voltage-controlled amplifier (VCA), three ADSR envelope generators, and a noise source. DCOs can generate multiple waveforms with variable pulse widths. The VCF can switch between 4-pole and 2-pole low-pass filters, with modulatable cutoff frequency and resonance. The VCA, controlled by velocity, shapes the amplitude.

The synthesizer's modulation capabilities are extensive, with four general-purpose modulation buses allowing for flexible routing. Some parameters, like LFOs and velocity, have dedicated modulation controls, bypassing the need for a bus. Common modulation targets include DCO pitch, VCF cutoff, and VCA level, with several parameters having dedicated knobs for direct control.

The Prophet '08 features two sets of stereo outputs, with sound routing to the second set when connected. Voices can be panned across the stereo field, with a dedicated knob adjusting the initial stereo spread. It features a 16-step sequencer with four rows, offering analog-style control. Each row can target any modulation parameter, with steps for DCO pitch in quarter-tone increments and continuous adjustment for other parameters.
