= Roland Jupiter-80 =

Synthesizer made by Roland in 2011

- Manufacturer: Roland Corporation
- Dates: 2011-2019
- Price: $3499

Technical specifications
- Polyphony: 256 voices
- Synthesis type: virtual Analog subtractive
- Aftertouch expression: yes
- Velocity expression: yes
- Storage memory: 64 patches
- Effects: Upper & Lower: Four MFX processors per Live Set Five configurations (version 2 only); 76 types One reverb processor for each Live Set Five effect types Solo & Percussion: Compressor/Equaliser/Delay: One of each for each Part One common reverb processor, five types Master Effects: 4-band EQ

Input/output
- Keyboard: 76 keys

The Jupiter-80 is a discontinued 256-voice polyphonic virtual analog subtractive synthesizer introduced by Roland Corporation in 2011. The Jupiter-80 is a part of Roland's flagship long-running synthesizer series, which began with the Jupiter-4 between the years of 1978 and 1981. The Jupiter-80 was shortly followed by the Jupiter-50, which is a combination of both the JP-80 and the JUNO series. It was succeeded by the Jupiter-X and Jupiter-Xm in 2019.

== Features and architecture ==
The Jupiter-80 maintains the visual style of the Jupiter-8, and includes Roland's SuperNATURAL, an extensive synthesis engine that includes virtual analog synthesis, which is digital recreation of earlier Roland analog synths, along with PCM-based recreations of purely digital synths by the company and acoustic modelling of real instruments. Emulations of the original Jupiter-8 sounds were later released as a software instrument for both keyboards on Roland Axial as part of the Synth Legends series.

The Jupiter utilizes MIDI control, D Beam Control, and Audio File format of WAV, AIFF, and MP3. The synthesizer's memory is external, by way of USB Flash.
