= Roland Jupiter-50 =

Synthesizer made by Roland in 2011

- Manufacturer: Roland Corporation
- Dates: 2011
- Price: $1999

Technical specifications
- Polyphony: 128 voices
- Synthesis type: digital subtractive
- Aftertouch expression: no
- Velocity expression: yes
- Storage memory: 64 patches
- Effects: Upper: 4 MFX processors in total, 5 configurations, 76 types Perc/Lower and Solo: None; Global Effects: 1 reverb processor, 5 effect types

Input/output
- Keyboard: 76 keys

The Jupiter-50 is a discontinued 128 voice polyphonic digital subtractive synthesizer introduced by Roland Corporation in 2011. The Jupiter-50 is a part of Roland's flagship synthesizer series, which began with the Jupiter-4 between the years of 1978 and 1981. The Jupiter-50 is considered a hybrid/combination of both the Jupiter-80 and the JUNO series.

== Features and architecture ==
The Jupiter-80 maintains the visual style of the Jupiter-8, and includes Roland's SuperNATURAL, an extensive synthesis engine that includes virtual analog synthesis, which is a digital recreation of earlier Roland analog synths, along with PCM-based recreations of purely digital synths by the company and acoustic modeling of real instruments. Emulations of the original Jupiter-8 sounds were later released as a software instrument for both keyboards on Roland Axial as part of the Synth Legends series.

The Jupiter-50 is a multitimbral synthesizer oriented to stage and live use. That's why it has 3 parts (Upper, Solo, Percussion/Lower). Its inventors prefer to use the term Live Sets which are used to combine different tones from the collection of 1,500 in order to create a multitimbral sound and control it in real-time. The maximum count of Live Sets is 2,560.

The Jupiter-50 utilizes MIDI control, D-Beam Control, a USB connection with MIDI implementation and audio interface functionality, and a USB song player/recorder that's compatible with WAV, AIFF, and MP3 audio file formats.

== Keyboard and controls ==
The Jupiter-50 is equipped with a 76-note/6 octave velocity-sensitive keyboard (no aftertouch). The front panel contains a large quantity of controls - including encoders, buttons, and sliders - but cannot be considered a "one knob - one function" interface, as controls may share functionality in different modes. Pitch/mod controls are combined via Roland's traditional lever.

== Size and weight ==
The concept was to create a travel-friendly version of the expensive and heavy Jupiter-80. The Jupiter-50 is indeed much more portable being more compact (127 cm wide) and weighing only 11 kg. The front panel is made using aluminium, the side panels are made from plastic despite their silver "alu" look. The bottom cover is plastic too.
