= Roland Alpha Juno =

Series of analog polyphonic synthesizers

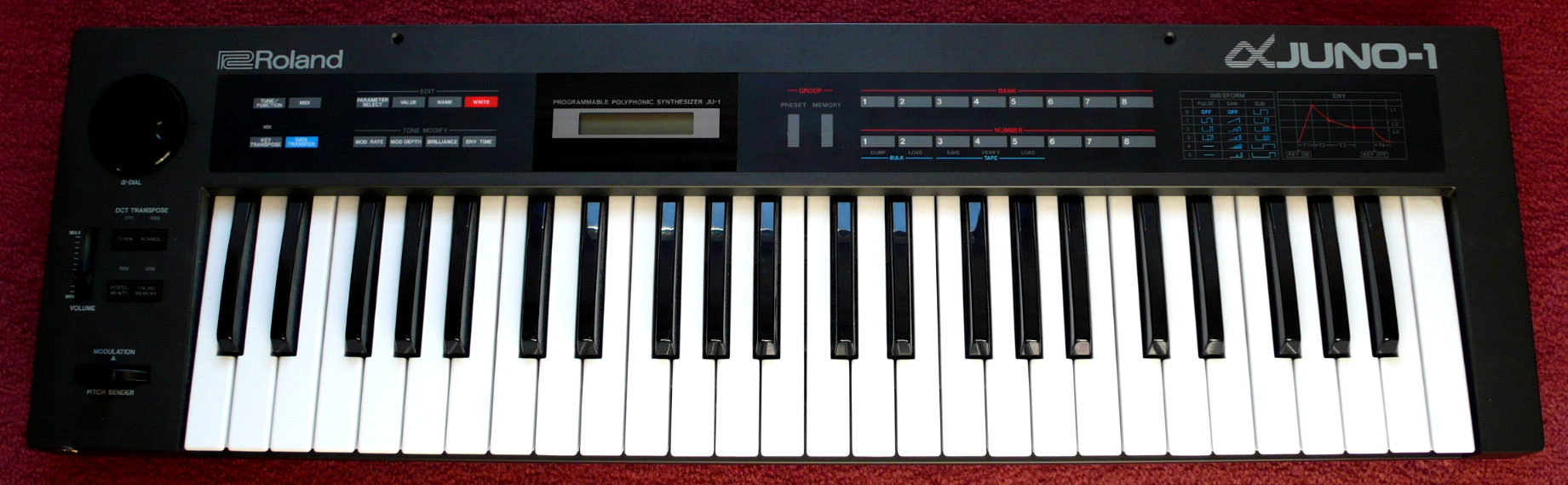
- Manufacturer: Roland
- Dates: 1985-1987
- Price: US$895 / UK£575 (JU-1); US$1,295 / UK£799 (JU-2)

Technical specifications
- Polyphony: 6 voices
- Timbrality: Monotimbral
- Oscillator: 1 DCO per voice (pulse, saw, square and noise, plus suboscillator)
- LFO: triangle
- Synthesis type: Analog Subtractive
- Filter: Analog 24dB/oct resonant low-pass
- Attenuator: ADSR envelope generator
- Aftertouch expression: No (JU-1)/Yes (JU-2)
- Velocity expression: No (JU-1)/Yes (JU-2)
- Storage memory: 128 patches (64 user, 64 preset)
- Effects: Chorus

Input/output
- Keyboard: 49 (JU-1)/61 (JU-2)
- External control: MIDI

The Roland Alpha Juno is a series of analog polyphonic synthesizers introduced by Roland Corporation in 1985. The Alpha Juno 1 and Alpha Juno 2 were released at the same time, and feature the same sound engine but with the latter boasting additional performance features. The Alpha Junos were a departure from their predecessor, the Roland Juno-106, as they replaced the dedicated controls with soft touch buttons and a single dial for programming sounds. One of the factory presets, nicknamed a 'hoover sound', became a staple in jungle and rave music.

== Sounds and features ==
In contrast to Roland's previous synthesizers, the Alpha Juno-1 and Alpha Juno-2 do not feature dedicated knobs or faders; editing is instead done with an 'Alpha dial', a continuously rotating control that selects and modifies parameters. Some parameters, such as modulation rate and depth, brilliance, and envelope time have dedicated selector buttons for quicker adjustments. To alter any of these settings during performance or programming, one presses the corresponding button and rotates the Alpha dial. The continuously rotating dial is reminiscent of controls previously seen on the Moog Source and Synclavier.

The Juno-1 and Juno-2 synthesizers expand upon the oscillator choices previously seen in the Juno-106, including three pulse waves and five sawtooth waves, along with a sub-oscillator that offers six pulse wave options. One of the pulse waves and one of the sawtooth waves can have their pulse width modulated using LFO or envelope control.

The Alpha Juno synthesizers feature a multi-stage envelope design that includes eight parameters, encompassing four timing settings, three levels, and a key follow function. A Yamaha DX7-style envelope chart is prominently displayed on the right-hand side of its control panel, which helps guide users through the complex envelope stages.

An integrated chorus effect on the Juno-1 and Juno-2 includes a programmable rate parameter, providing more options than the fixed dual-rate chorus found on the Juno-106. The Alpha Junos feature 64 factory presets as well as memory for 64 programmable user sounds.

== Variants ==
In 1985, Roland introduced two versions of the Alpha Juno series: the Alpha Juno 1 (JU-1) and the Alpha Juno 2 (JU-2). The JU-2 expanded on the JU-1 by offering an additional octave of keys, incorporating velocity sensitivity, aftertouch, and including a cartridge slot for patch storage. For the home market, Roland released the HS-10 as the equivalent of the Juno 1, and the HS-80 as the home market version of the Juno 2, both featuring a different colour scheme but sharing the same sound engine as their counterparts.

The MKS-50 was released in 1987 and is a rack-mount version of the Alpha Juno. It has the same synth engine and architecture, with some added features like 16 programmable chord memories, and the ability to store velocity, volume, panning, de-tune, portamento and other similar parameters within each patch.

The optional Roland PG-300 programmer made every MIDI parameter editable with a dedicated slider or switch. It retailed for £200 and was compatible with the Alpha Juno 1, the Alpha Juno 2, the MKS-50, and the home market versions.

== Legacy ==
The Alpha Junos had little impact upon release and were overshadowed by Yamaha's dominance with its FM synthesizer range, with the shifting preference from traditional analog to digital and FM synthesis technologies placed the Alpha Juno at a disadvantage.

A factory preset called "WhatThe" became popular in rave, hardcore techno and jungle music, earning the moniker "Hoover sound" due to its distinctive pitch modulation effect. This preset was initially created by Roland sound designer Eric Persing as a joke. Early examples of the Hoover sound include "Dominator" by Human Resource, "Mentasm" by Second Phase and "Charly (Alley Cat Mix)" by The Prodigy, all released in 1991. Later uses of the Hoover sound include "Bad Romance" by Lady Gaga and "Birthday Cake" by Rihanna.

In 2014, Audio Realism introduced Redominator, a software emulation of the Alpha Juno 2 that reads sysex presets from the original synths. In 2024, TAL Software launched TAL-Pha, another software plugin emulating the MKS-50 rack version of the Alpha Juno 2, which is capable of reading and converting sysex data from the original Alpha Junos as well as functioning as a software controller for them.
