= Generalmusic =

Italian musical instrument manufacturing company

- Industry: Musical instrument manufacturing
- Founded: 1987 in Italy
- Fate: Declared bankrupt 2011
- Headquarters: Italy
- Products: Musical instruments
- Website: www.generalmusic.com

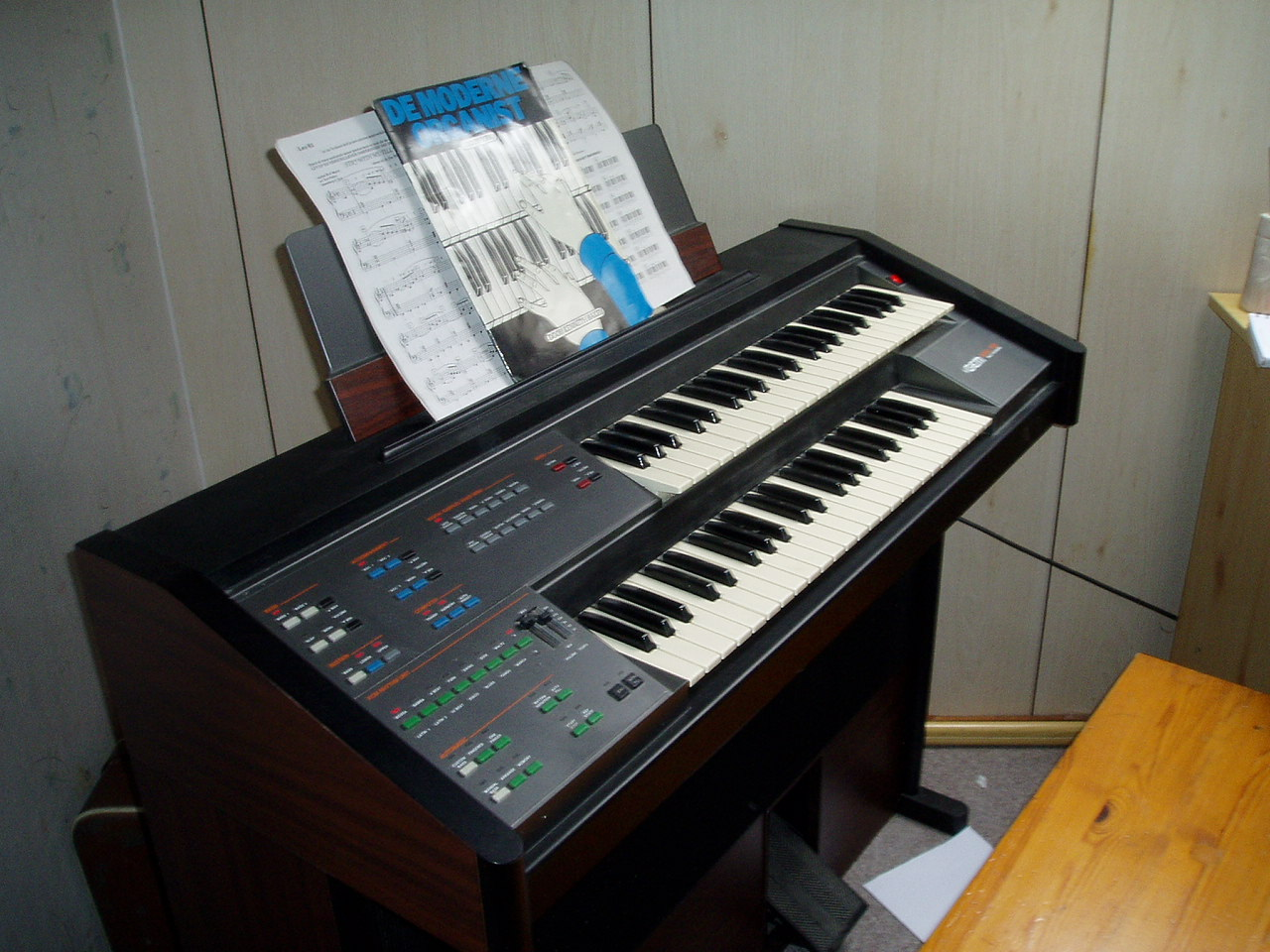
GEM MK-10 electronic organ

Generalmusic was an Italian musical instrument manufacturing company focusing on digital and acoustic pianos, synthesizers and music workstations. The company produced three lines: a musical instrument series called GEM, a various studio equipment series called LEM and electric organs/synthesizers called ELKA. It was founded in 1987 and ceased business in 2009 before becoming bankrupt in 2011.

== History ==
=== Early years ===
Generalmusic's first arranger workstation models were their WS series, released in 1990. Featuring a 5-track sequencer, 32 built-in arranger styles, and 32 user-programmable styles, they predated the General MIDI standard. This limited easy interoperability with other devices. The WX series (released in 1993) did implement General MIDI, offered a large blue LCD, a user-friendly interface and some vintage synth sound presets like Oberheim, ARP 2600, Prophet or Elka Synthex. Although designed as arranger workstations, WX series had some professional synthesizer capabilities like filter and cutoff (resonance) editing with an integrated powerful 16-track sequencer. The company also offered more sophisticated versions of the WX series as S series synthesizers. The S2 was similar to a Kurzweil K2000 for its functionalities such as optional sampling, and layout and patch manipulation.

Generalmusic bought the GEM company, which had itself bought Elka-Orla, a piano and organ maker that transitioned into synthesizers in the 1970s. The Synthex is the best known of a range of Elka instruments.

=== After 1990 ===
From the 1990s to 2000, Generalmusic introduced a physically modeled, digital half-rack piano module known as the RealPiano Expander. This module featured realistic, physically modeled grand pianos with continuous damper pedal functionality. However, the RealPiano Expander's delicate LCD readout was prone to failure due to the internal placement of the LCD ribbon wire close to the top front edge of the plastic front bezel. To prevent damage to the LCD ribbon wire, users were advised not to place heavy objects on top of the module. Some users replaced the LCD ribbon wire themselves, although a damaged LCD ribbon wire did not impact sound quality or other functions. The device also had a few uncorrected bugs related to key velocity in the upgradable EPROM firmware.

In 2006, the RealPiano Expander was succeeded by the GEM RP-X half-rack module, which featured the DRAKE (DSP RISC Advanced Keyboard Engine) simulating instruments like the Fazioli F308 and Steinway & Sons grand pianos.

The Genesys series marked Generalmusic's last generation of synthesizers, offering onboard sampling from an integrated CD-ROM, audio sequencer, audio sequencer tracks, and flash ROM. Additionally, the company provided the entry-level GK series and a simplified WK version named WK-1000/2000.

Generalmusic also produced digital pianos, notably the Promega series, which garnered more interest than their synthesizer products.

However, in February 2009, Generalmusic dismissed its employees and promptly filed for bankruptcy, with the declaration occurring in 2011.

In December 2014, the Finnish group Soundion Oy Ltd (the new owner of GEM, LEM, and Elka) announced plans for Generalmusic to release a product lineup in 2015, consisting of re-issued models alongside new technology offerings. Production was set to be established in Finland.

By July 2015, there were intentions to launch a reissue of the classic Elka Synthex synthesizer, and a crowdfunding campaign was initiated on Indiegogo. Regrettably, the campaign failed to reach the anticipated funding, and the Synthex project seemed to have been cancelled.

As of 2021, Generalmusic (Finland) is manufacturing a range of digital pianos branded as Gem Promega 2+, utilizing "UpDRAKE" technology, which appears to be a further development of the original Generalmusic DRAKE technology for digital organs (US Patent 5,442,128).
