= Roland JX-3P =

Analog synthesizer

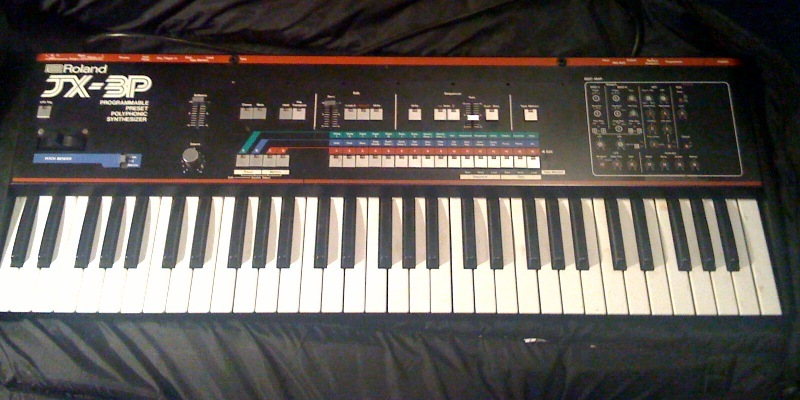
- Roland JX-3P
- Manufacturer: Roland
- Dates: 1983-1985
- Price: US $1395; UK £1075

Technical specifications
- Polyphony: 6 voices
- Timbrality: Monotimbral
- Oscillator: 2 DCOs per voice
- LFO: 1 sine/square/sh
- Synthesis type: Analog Subtractive
- Filter: 1 resonant lowpass, 1 highpass
- Attenuator: 1 ADSR
- Aftertouch expression: No
- Velocity expression: No
- Storage memory: 32 presets/32 user patches
- Effects: chorus

Input/output
- Keyboard: 61 keys
- External control: MIDI

The Roland JX-3P is a synthesizer produced by Roland Corporation of Japan from 1983–1985. The "3P" in its name refers to "Programmable Preset Polyphonic". It is notable as one of the company's first synthesizers (along with the Jupiter-6) to incorporate a MIDI interface.

== Features ==
The JX-3P is a six-note polyphonic, 2 DCOs, 61 key synthesizer with sawtooth, 50 and 10% pulse waveforms, and a noise generator. It has 32 factory programs in ROM, and user memory for 32 programs.

The JX-3P also features a built-in 128-step polyphonic sequencer that can be synchronized to external devices, such as drum machines, connected to its simple clock pulse input jack. MIDI clock synchronization is not supported.

As one of the earliest MIDI devices, the JX-3P's MIDI implementation is basic, supporting only note on/off, pitch bend, hold, modulation and program change messages. Neither "System Exclusive" nor "Continuous Controllers" (CC) are implemented, so external patch storage or real-time parameter updates are not possible through MIDI (except with third-party upgrades).

The JX-3P is fully programmable from its front panel. To do so, each synthesis parameter must be selected numerically, then its value can be adjusted with a single slider. For a more immediate programming experience, Roland offered the optional PG-200 "programmer," a simple control surface with dedicated switches and potentiometers for editing each of the JX-3P's parameters. The PG-200 connects to the synthesizer through a proprietary interface and provides hardware sliders dedicated to most JX-3P parameters for editing patches. It is not possible to use the PG-200 and the MIDI interface at the same time, however. The PG-200 programmer also served to edit patches for the Roland GR-700 Guitar Synthesizer, which shares the same voice architecture and sound engine as the JX-3P.

== Juno series lineage ==
The JX-3P's architecture is similar to the Juno series synths produced around the same time. Both machines employ the same interval-timer DCO technology, use the Roland IR3109 low-pass filter, a discrete VCA, and have an on-board stereo chorus effect. The JX-3P has a single ADSR envelope generator and a single modulation oscillator - both software-generated (while the Juno-6 and Juno-60 use analogue circuitry for the envelope generator).

The JX-3P had two distinct DCOs with detuning and several cross-modulation modes, as opposed to the single DCO with sub-oscillator design of the Juno line. Also unlike the Juno, the JX-3P allows the pitch of either oscillator to be controlled by its envelope generator and lfo. Juno features lacking in the JX-3P include portamento and a second chorus mode.

== Variants and aftermarket upgrades ==
Roland also produced a rackmount synthesizer similar to the JX-3P, the MKS-30 Planet-S. Unlike the JX-3P, the MKS-30 would respond to velocity (dynamics) via MIDI, and can receive MIDI notes while simultaneously working with the PG-200 programmer.

There is an EPROM version available at Roland, which enables MIDI reception of note velocity. There is an add-on kit available from Series Circuits (see link below), which enables parallel usage of PG-200 and MIDI and also introduces parameter control via MIDI controller data (and includes the functionality of the Roland EPROM update). The New Zealand based company Kiwitechnics offers an upgrade kit called "Kiwi-3P" which significantly enhances the functionality of the JX-3P.
