= Roland Jupiter-6 =

Discontinued Synthesizer

Jupiter-6
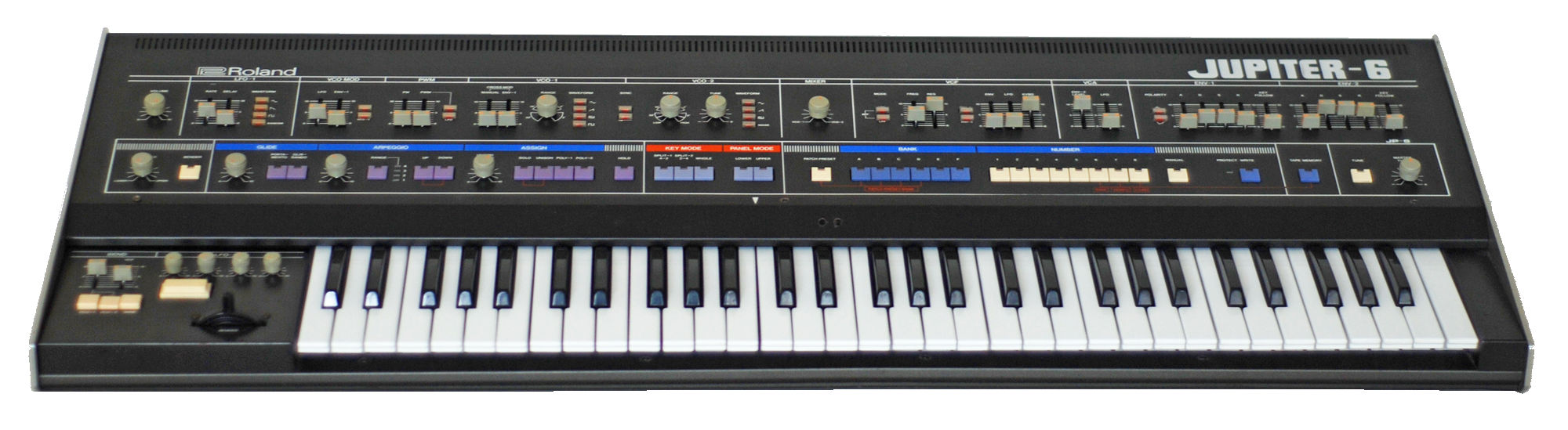
- Roland Jupiter-6
- Manufacturer: Roland
- Dates: January 1983 - 1985
- Price: US$2995; UK£2250; JP¥490,000

Technical specifications
- Polyphony: 6 voices
- Timbrality: 2
- Oscillator: 2 VCOs per voice
- LFO: 2, 1 in LH control section (sine) / 1 programmable, triangle/sawtooth/square/random
- Synthesis type: Analog Subtractive
- Filter: 1 resonant multi-mode (lowpass/bandpass/hipass) filter
- Attenuator: 2 ADSR
- Aftertouch expression: No
- Velocity expression: No
- Storage memory: 48 tones/32 patches
- Effects: None

Input/output
- Keyboard: 61 keys
- External control: MIDI

The Roland Jupiter-6 (JP-6) is a discontinued subtractive synthesizer, manufactured and introduced by the Roland Corporation in January 1983.

== Background ==
Although introduced as a less expensive ($2,500-$3,000 market price) alternative to the Roland Jupiter-8, its features include some capabilities not present in the JP-8. The Jupiter-6 is widely considered a workhorse among polyphonic analog synthesizers, capable of producing a wide variety of sounds, such as ambient drones, pads, lead synthesizer lines, unison basses and techy blips and buzzes. It is renowned for its reliability and ease, but with sophisticated programmability.

The JP-6 has 12 analog oscillators (2 per voice), and is bitimbral, allowing its keyboard to be "split" into two sounds - one with 4 voices, and one with the remaining 2 voices (either "Split 4/2" or "Split 2/4" mode). "Whole Mode" is also available, dedicating all 6 voices to single (monotimbral) sound across the entire keyboard. Available waveforms include sawtooth, triangle, variable width pulse, square, and noise. Unusually, the JP-6 allows simultaneous selection of any or all of the waveforms in each of its two oscillator banks, an option not found on the JP-8. Oscillator sync and cross modulation are also available. "Unison Mode" allows all 12 oscillators to be triggered simultaneously by depressing a single key. Unison Mode can also be played polyphonically, with the number of oscillators triggered by each key determined by the number of keys held down.

The JP-6 was among the first electronic instruments (alongside the Roland JX-3P and the Sequential Circuits Prophet-600) to feature MIDI, then a brand new technology. Sequential CEO Dave Smith demonstrated MIDI by connecting the Prophet to a Jupiter-6 during the January, 1983 Winter NAMM Show.

Europa, a popular firmware upgrade available from Synthcom Systems, added a wide array of modern enhancements to the JP-6's MIDI implementation, user interface, patch memory, and arpeggiator.

== Notable users ==
- Charly García
- Chemical Brothers
- The Crystal Method
- Devo
- Dubstar
- Eddie Kulak of Aztec Camera
- Goldfrapp
- Greg Ham of Men at Work
- Human League
- Julio Bashmore
- Kevin Saunderson (of Inner City)
- King Crimson
- Mike O'Donnell and Junior Campbell (Musical score for the first two series of Thomas the Tank Engine & Friends)
- Nathan Fake
- Orbital
- Orchestral Manoeuvres in the Dark
- Peggy Gou
- Pet Shop Boys
- Ray Parker Jr.
- Rhythm Plate
- Rob Preuss of The Spoons
- Tangerine Dream
- Thomas Gandey
- The Unicorns
- Vangelis
- Vašo Patejdl
- ZZ Top
