= Sturm Café =

Swedish musical duo

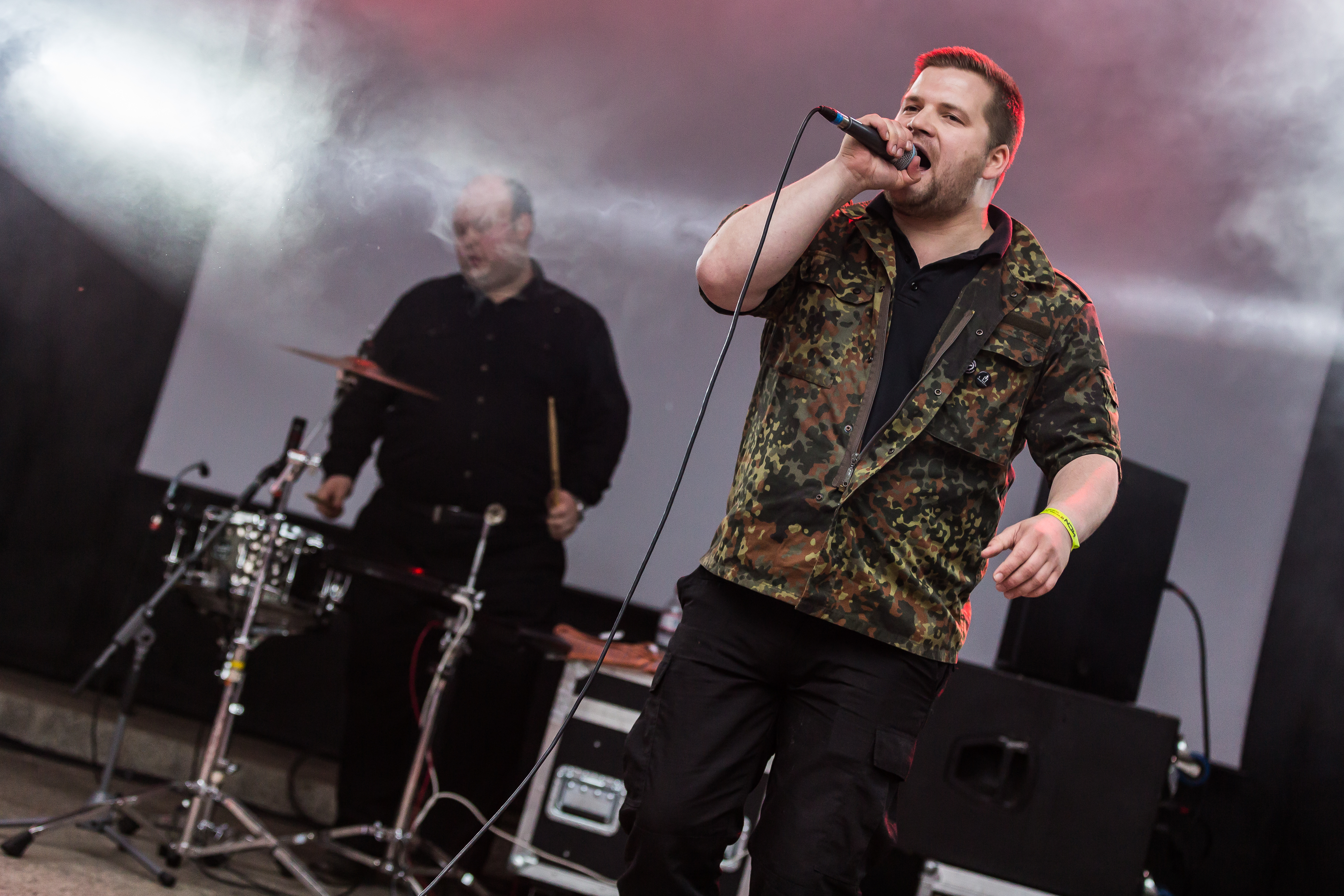
- Sturm Café in 2017

Background information
- Also known as: The Xenophobian Alliance
- Origin: Gävle, Sweden
- Genres: EBM; Synthpop
- Years active: 2001–present
- Labels: Progress Productions; SCR
- Spinoffs: John Steiner Explosion
- Members: Jonatan Löftstedt; Gustav Jansson

Sturm Café is an electronic body music band from Gävle, Sweden.

Music made by Sturm Café provided the soundtrack of the movie Die Zombiejäger.

== History ==
Sturm Café was founded by the two teenage boys Gustav and Jonatan who met at a very young age in Gävle, Sweden. As teens they began playing with various instruments and the equipment in Jansson's father's studio. They released a couple of demo cassette tapes under the name The Xenophobian Alliance which were handed out to close friends. The instrumentation was a cheap digital synth with an Atari for sequencing and an analog 4 channel portable studio.

Later on in 2002 they bought some analogue synthesizers and a digital portable studio and the music started to spread through mp3.com. At this time, the name of the band had been changed to Sturm Café as suggested by Gustav's father who was a fan of EBM bands such as DAF and Front 242. Influenced by Gustav's father's music collection, the duo moved toward an EBM sound with minimalistic analogue basslines, monotonous drum machines and chanting vocals in German. Despite being Swedish, they were inspired to sing in German owing to Löftstedt having learned German in school and the language being understood as a typical aspect of EBM style.

This eventually led to some live gigs in early 2003 and in the summer of 2004 they performed live at Sweden's biggest open air alternative music festival, Arvika Festival. Later that year, they signed a contract with the record label Progress Productions and played several shows in Germany including at Berlin's Bodybeats club.

One year later, the album So Seelisch, So Schön! was released and climbed to position 75 on the Swedish official album sell chart. That autumn, Jonatan moved to Poland for medicine studies. Sturm Café was put on hold. However, Jonatan moved back to Sweden the next year and the work with the band could continue. Even after returning to Sweden, Löftstedt and Jansson lived an 8-hour car ride from each other, making it difficult to work together given their dependence on vintage equipment.

In 2010, the band opened for Deutsch Amerikanische Freundschaft at BIMFest in Belgium. That year the band also embarked on starting a label, SCR (Sturm Café Releases), with their first release being the 7" single "Koka Kola Freiheit". In considering starting the label, the band balanced demands of their non-music careers with the needs of a third-party label, ultimately deciding that the risks of running their own label were outweighed by control of the release schedule and creative process.

The band played their first non-European shows in Mexico City in 2015 and the following year in Lima, Peru.

Löftstedt also has a side project of dance music that he determined did not fit with Sturm Café called John Steiner Explosion. Some tracks from his side project were released on the band's Rarities 3 compilation in 2020.

== Band members ==
- Jonatan Löfstedt - vocals, music
- Gustav Jansson - music, live keyboards & drums

=== Occasional band members / collaborators ===
- Pehr-Anders Stockenberg - live drums (2007–2009)
- Oskar Gullstrand - videoprojections, art work, music videos (2002–2006)
- Joakim Mohlund - guest vocals on "Schweiss Bier und Stahl", live keyboards and drums
- Slim Vic - credited as remixer on "So Seelisch, So Schön!" 2CD version.
- Chinese Theatre - credited as remixer on "So Seelisch, So Schön!" 2CD version
- Patrik Linderstam - visuals, graphic design

== Discography ==
- So Seelisch, So Schön! CD/2CD (2005)
- Tot CDM (2008)
- Koka Kola Freiheit 7" (2010)
- Rarities 2xCD (2013)
- Europa! CD & 2x12" (2015)
- Es Geht CD, 12" & MC (2017)
- So Seelisch, So Schön! Reissue CD & 12" (2019)
- Europa! Second press CD (2019)
- Fernes Land CD, 12" & MC (2021)
- Der Löwe aus dem Norden CD & MC (2022)
- Zeitgeist CD, 12" & MC (2023)

=== Compilations ===
- APE Produkt #3 CDR (contributing track: "Regimegegner") (2003)
- Electronic Compilation CD-R (contributing track: "In Meinem Griff" + "Radiosüchtig") (2004)
- Interbreeding III: Xenophobic 2CD (contributing track: "In Meinem Griff" + "Mr.T") (2004)
- ElectriXmas 2004 CD (contributing track: "Ein Mann Und Sein Bart") (2004)
- Born / Evolve / Progress vol.1 CD (contributing track: "Stiefelfabrik" + "Schweiss Bier und Stahl") (2005)
- Hymns of Steel CD (contributing track: "Schweiss Bier und Stahl") (2006)
- Sonic Seducer Cold Hands Seduction Vol. 56 2CD (contributing track: "Die Wahrheit") (2006)
- Infacted vol.3 CD (contributing track: "Radiosüchtig") (2006)
- Born / Evolve / Progress vol.2 CD (contributing track: "Weltliches Leben") (2007)
- Mortal Decay 2CD-R (contributing track: "Der Grosse Schwein (Terror Punk Syndicate Remix)") (2007)
- Infected vol.4 2CD (contributing track: "Tot (Terror Punk Syndicate Remix)") (2008)
- Machines Against Hunger 2CD (contributing track: "1/15") (2008)
- Nacht Der Maschinen VolumeTwo CD (contributing track: "Ich Spekuliere") (2008)
- 5 Years Of Progress - 2004-2009 CD (contributing track: "Der Löwe Ist Zurück") (2009)
- EBM Collection Vol.1 12" (contributing track: "Der Löwe Ist Zurück") (2009)
- Swedish EBM - The Collection CD (contributing track: "Scheissnormal") (2010)
- Nacht Der Maschinen Volume Three (contributing track: "Der Löwe Ist Zurück") (2011)
- Electronic Body Matrix 1 (contributing track: "Die Wahrheit") (2011)
- Doppelhertz Vol. 2 (contributing track: "Sicherheit") (2011)

== Complete tour history ==
- Klubb Volga, Sweden Stockholm, April 23, 2003
- Club Absynth, Sweden Gävle, May 30, 2003
- Kungen, Sweden Sandviken, July 18, 2003
- Valhall, Sweden Falun, July 20, 2003
- Musikhuset, Sweden Gävle, December 13, 2003
- Electrobash #2, Sweden Uppsala, January 23, 2004
- Adrenalinfestival, Sweden Sundsvall, January 31, 2004
- Club Spacelab, Sweden Gothenburg, February 6, 2004
- Club Absynth, Sweden Gävle, March 11, 2004
- Kungen, Sweden Sandviken, April 3, 2004
- More Than A Party '04, Sweden Uppsala, April 11, 2004
- Vogon Variety, Sweden Malmö, May 8, 2004
- Plasticity, Sweden Gothenburg, July 9, 2004
- Arvikafestival, Sweden Arvika, July 15, 2004
- Electronic Wonders, Sweden Oskarshamn, October 30, 2004
- Bodybeats, Germany Berlin, November 13, 2004
- Beatclub, Germany Dessau, November 20, 2004
- Club Harrow Road, Sweden Örebro, December 3, 2004
- ElectriXmas, Sweden Lund, December 11, 2004
- Allhuset, Sweden Stockholm, December 17, 2004
- Club Spacelab, Sweden Gothenburg, February 4, 2005
- Musikhuset, Sweden Gävle, March 18, 2005
- Sticky Fingers, Sweden Gothenburg, November 4, 2005
- Nuclear Nation, Sweden Linköping, November 5, 2005
- Neostalgia, Sweden Malmö, February 4, 2006
- Allhuset, Sweden Stockholm, February 11, 2006
- SAMA, Sweden Gothenburg, April 14, 2006
- Der Bunker, Sweden Gothenburg, July 28, 2006
- Beatclub, Germany Dessau, September 9, 2006
- Klubb Lakritz, Sweden Norrköping, November 24, 2006
- Das Boot, Baltic Sea December 8, 2006
- Sus Fel Nap, Hungary Budapest, January 19, 2007
- Tech Noir, Sweden Stockholm, January 27, 2007
- Musikhuset, Sweden Gävle, February 23, 2007
- Die Villa, Germany Leipzig, April 7, 2007
- Club Undercut, Sweden Lund, May 3, 2007
- Void Spring Festival, Sweden Kalmar, May 5, 2007
- Club Hellfire, Norway Trondheim, June 9, 2007
- Club Maiden, Norway Oslo, June 10, 2007
- Familientreffen III, Germany Sandersleben, August 4, 2007
- Club Radium, Sweden Karlstad, November 2, 2007
- Beatclub, Germany Dessau, March 23, 2008
- Club Arkham, Finland Turku, November 21, 2008
- Club Lagerhof, Germany Leipzig, December 6, 2008
- Musikens Hus, Sweden Gothenburg, May 16, 2009
- Familientreffen V, Germany Sandersleben, July 24, 2009
- Bodytåget, Sweden Stockholm, March 6, 2010
- Klubb Kalabalik, Sweden Växjö, March 20, 2010
- Traffic Club, Italy Rome, April 3, 2010
- Salzmanns Factory, Germany Kassel, July 10, 2010
- Collapsed City Festival, Poland Szczecin, October 31, 2010
- Belgian Independent Music Festival, Belgium Antwerp, December 18, 2010
- Holdeplassen, Norway Trondheim, March 19, 2011
- Beatclub, Germany Dessau, March 26, 2011
- Bodyfest, Sweden Stockholm, October 1, 2011
- Neostalgia, Sweden Malmö, March 24, 2012
- Kulttempel, Germany Oberhausen, September 7, 2012
- EBM Music Club, Germany Cologne, February 23, 2013
- Familientreffen IX, Germany Sandersleben, July 5, 2013
- Kafka Club, Belgium Antwerp, September 13, 2013
- Summer Stomp, Germany Kassel, September 14, 2013
- Club Sputnik, Sweden Jönköping, April 26, 2014
- Electronic Summer, Sweden Gothenburg, August 29, 2015
- EBM Music Club, Germany Cologne, September 19, 2015
- Bodyfest, Sweden Stockholm, October 23, 2015
- El Baile de Mascaras Episodio XIV, Mexico Mexico City, October 30, 2015
- El Real Under, Mexico Mexico City, October 31, 2015
- Beatclub, Germany Dessau, December 31, 2015
- El Calabozo, Peru Lima, August 6, 2016
- VII. E-Only Festival, Germany Leipzig, February 18, 2017
- Kalabalik På Tyrolen, Sweden Alvesta, August 26, 2017
- 12. NCN Festival, Germany Deutzen, September 8, 2017
- Soho Stage, Germany Augsburg, September 9, 2017
- Stiefel Fest, Germany Oberhausen, November 3, 2017
- Blasphemous Beats, Germany Hamburg, November 4, 2017
- Progress 13, Sweden Gothenburg, November 18, 2017
- Wave Gotik Treffen, Germany Leipzig, May 20, 2018
- Sticky Fingers, Sweden Gothenburg, September 14, 2018
- Klubb Död, Sweden Stockholm, December 1, 2018
- Replugged, Austria Vienna, March 30, 2019
- Subkultfestivalen 2019, Sweden Trollhättan, June 15, 2019
- Celebrata Hindrheimr 2019, Norway Trondheim, July 6, 2019
- Nuclear Nation, Sweden Linköping, October 12, 2019
- EBM Night, Switzerland Zürich, November 9, 2019
- Bimfest XVII, Belgium Sint-Niklaas, December 14, 2019
- Vardagsrumfestival, Sweden Staffanstorp, February 1, 2020
- The Place, Russia Saint Petersburg, February 22, 2020
- Alibi, Russia Moscow, February 23, 2020
- Klubb Berlin, Sweden Umeå, March 12, 2022
- Barbros Brygga Sweden Karlstad, March 25, 2022
- Musikens Hus, Sweden Gothenburg, March 26, 2022
- Musikhuset, Sweden Gävle, April 23, 2022
- WGT EBM Warm Up Day 1, Germany Leipzig, July 9, 2022
- WGT EBM Warm Up Day 2, Germany Leipzig, July 10, 2022
- Subkultfestivalen 2022, Sweden Vänersborg, July 9, 2022
- Amphi Festival, Germany Cologne, July 24, 2022
- Lygten Station, Denmark Copenhagen, September 9, 2022
- Charles Dickens, Sweden Helsingborg, September 10, 2022
- Schattenwelt Festival 2022, Austria Vienna, October 8, 2022
- Klubb Död, Sweden Stockholm, November 19, 2022
- Kulttempel, Germany Oberhausen, January 20, 2023
- Der Cult, Germany Nuremberg, March 11, 2023
- Darkest Night, Belgium Retie, April 23, 2023
- Familientreffen, Germany Sandersleben, July 8, 2023
- Summer Stomp, Germany Kassel, September 23, 2023
- Musikhuset, Sweden Gävle, October 7, 2023
- Alternativfesten, Sweden Sandviken, November 11, 2023
- Musikens Hus, Sweden Gothenburg, November 25, 2023
- E-Tropolis Festival, Germany Oberhausen, March 2, 2024
- WGT EBM Warm Up, Germany Leipzig, May 16, 2024
- Subkultfestivalen 2024, Sweden Vänersborg, June 29, 2024
- Synth I Molkom, Sweden Molkom, August 10, 2024
- Maschinensturm Festival, Germany Fürstenwalde, September 28, 2024
- Charles Dickens, Sweden Helsingborg, October 19, 2024
- Sturm und Drang vol.2, Germany Zwickau, November 9, 2024
- Klubb Död, Sweden Stockholm, March 22, 2025
- Wave Gotik Treffen, Germany Leipzig, June 8, 2025
- Schwarzer Speicher 2025, Germany Nienhagen, July 26, 2025
- Musikhuset, Sweden Gävle, September 20, 2025
- Valand, Sweden Gothenburg, October 3, 2025
- Gränden Sweden Karlstad, October 4, 2025
- Anestesia Bar Mexico Guadalajara, October 24, 2025
- Synth Fest VI Mexico Mexico City, October 25, 2025
- Amón Solar Costa Rica San José, October 29, 2025
- Relevent Music Hall Colombia Bogotá, October 30, 2025
- Santiago Gothic Treffen Chile Santiago, November 1, 2025
- Madame Brazil São Paulo, November 2, 2025
- Cadavra Spain Madrid, November 28, 2025
- Sala Slow Spain Barcelona, November 29, 2025
- Aces and Eights United Kingdom London, January 24, 2026
- Nuclear Nation, Sweden Linköping, June 6, 2026
- Subkultfestivalen 2026, Sweden Trollhättan, June 27, 2026
- Jon-Fest 2026, Sweden Riddarhyttan, July 18, 2026
- 19. NCN Festival, Germany Deutzen, September 6, 2026
