= Roland JX-10 =

Analog synthesizer

Roland Super JX (Roland JX-10)
- Manufacturer: Roland
- Dates: 1986-1989
- Price: US$2,750; UK£1,800; JP¥298,000

Technical specifications
- Polyphony: 12-voice in 'WHOLE' and 'SPLIT' mode, 6-voice in 'DUAL' mode
- Timbrality: 2-part ('SPLIT'/'DUAL' modes)
- Oscillator: 2 DCOs per voice/4 in 'DUAL' mode. Waveforms: SAW/SQUARE/FIXED PULSE/NOISE. Oscillator sync, xmod.
- LFO: 1 sine/square/random=noise with delay and rate
- Synthesis type: Analog Subtractive
- Filter: 24dB/oct resonant low-pass, non-resonant high-pass
- Attenuator: 2 ADSR Envelopes/4 in 'DUAL' Mode. They both have 3 levels (and '0') of "Key Follow"
- Aftertouch expression: Yes
- Velocity expression: Yes
- Storage memory: 50 preset tones/50 user tones/64 patches, optional M-64C memory cartridges holding 50 tones
- Effects: chorus, delay ('chase play' using voices, not a 'real' delay effect)

Input/output
- Keyboard: 76 keys
- Left-hand control: Pitch bend Lever with upward moving controlling LFO
- External control: MIDI for playing notes/PG-800 programmer for sound editing

The Roland JX-10 Super JX is a 12-voice analog synthesizer keyboard produced by Roland Corporation from 1986 to 1989, along with a rack-mounted version, the MKS-70. For nearly 30 years, it was the last true analog synthesizer made by Roland and has been critically acclaimed as one of their classic analog instruments. In 2015, Roland once again started producing analog synthesizers beginning with their JD-XA and JD-Xi keyboards as analog/digital crossover synthesizers. The design on the JX-10 is essentially two Roland JX-8P synthesizers put together, with a 76-note velocity-sensitive keyboard with aftertouch. It also includes features not found on the JX-8P, including a simple 1-track sketchbook sequencer and a delay effect (which works like a "MIDI delay" by delaying one tone rather than acting as a true DSP delay effect). However, the JX-10 is not exactly the same as "two JX-8P's" because the chorus is not identical to the JX-8P (hence the chorus sounds different between the JX-8P and the JX-10 with single patches). The JX-10 also has a slightly different amplifier section as well as different electronic components which further distinguish its sound from its predecessor, the JX-8P.

== Programmability ==
Like most synthesizers of the time, the JX-10 is programmed by selecting the desired parameter through a keypad and editing that parameter using a data wheel Roland dubbed the "Alpha-Dial". Like the JX-8P, this editing technique can be bypassed by connecting a PG-800 device to the programmer port located on the back of the keyboard synthesizer, or on the front of the rack-mounted version. Alternatively the JX-10 and MKS-70 can be programmed over MIDI using a controller device such as the KiwiTechnics Patch Editor (a firmware update is required on the JX-10).

== Factory presets ==
The JX-10 and MKS-70's factory presets were created by Eric Persing and Dan DeSousa.

== Playing modes ==
The JX-10 combines two completely separate 6-voice Tone Modules (A-Upper and B-Lower) which allow it to function as a single 12-voice synthesizer or as two 6-voice synths capable of layering or splitting two different Tones simultaneously. There are six playing modes:

- Dual Mode - layers sounds from both Tone modules which can be balanced
- Split Mode - allows for split-keyboard play of the Tone modules, upper and lower sections can overlap
- Whole A - Upper Tone Module controls all 12 voices
- Whole B - Lower Tone Module controls all 12 voices
- Touch Voice Mode - adds velocity switching
- Cross-Fade Mode - controlled by the amount of velocity, one tone fades in while the other tone fades out

== Memory ==
The JX-10 has space for 64 patches in its internal memory, each of which can be composed with one (12-voice) or two tones (rendering the synth 6-voice polyphonic). These tones can be selected individually, combined together, or split. Of the 100 available tones, 50 of them can be edited and saved to memory; the other 50 are factory patches. The JX-10's memory can also be expanded by plugging in a M-16C, M-32C (very rare, originally only available on the Japanese market) or M-64C memory cartridge. If a cartridge is inserted, the JX-10's built in sketchbook sequencer can be used (it can only be used if a cartridge is present). The JX-10 / MKS-70 can also read and write tone data for the JX-8P this way (which in turn can only use the M-16C). The M-64C can store 64 patches and 100 tones; the M-16C can store 32 tones only (no patches).

== MIDI implementation ==
The MIDI implementation on the JX-10 is somewhat faulty and lacks common features. Most importantly it cannot send or receive Tone or Patches by MIDI SysEx. The MKS-70 (rack version of the JX-10) does however send and receive tones and patches over SysEx because it has different firmware in EPROM. If the firmware in the JX-10 is updated, then it will support SysEx.

The JX-10 transmits MIDI Control Change 123 (all notes off) instead of "normal" MIDI Note-Off messages every time a key is released (the JX-8P does this as well). This can be filtered out by editing CC 123 in the sequencer if it creates any problems; normally it does not.

== MKS-70 ==
Like the JX-8P, the JX-10 also has a 2U rack-mounted counterpart called the MKS-70 which was available 1986–1989. It is basically the same as the JX-10, except that the MKS-70's tones can be edited through MIDI using SysEx (this can be rectified on the JX-10, see below).

== Display ==
The JX-8P, JX-10 and the MKS-70 use vacuum fluorescent displays which give the instruments their characteristic green/blue glowing display. In some cases these displays can fail with age, indicating 888888888888 or having other issues. One cause of these problems is the corrosion of a small coil component in the display driver circuit. While Roland used similar displays across a number of products at this time, interchangeability of displays between products is limited. Replacement parts are scarce and some experimenters have replaced the vacuum display with an LCD device and supporting circuitry. In January 2014 a custom supply of new coils became available for the JX-8/JX-10 and the MKS-70. As a spin off project from the Vecoven firmware update, in 2016, a full replacement display was made available for users unable to fix their displays with a new coil.

== Firmware update ==
The firmware for the circuitry on the Assigner board, the part of the synthesizer controlling the voices and managing MIDI, has been criticised as incomplete and inferior, especially on the JX-10. Successful attempts have been made to improve the firmware of the JX-10 as well as on its rack-mounted version, the MKS-70.

A modified firmware for the JX-10 was first released by Colin Fraser. It gave the JX-10 the additional MKS-70 functionality: SysEx editing of tone parameters via MIDI. The update is made by exchanging a socketed EPROM chip (a 32 KB 27C256) on the Assigner board.

In 2013, Frederic Vecoven started rewriting a JX-10/MKS-70 firmware from scratch, building on Fraser's analysis of the original code. The firmware retrofit offers advanced MIDI control via SysEx and NRPN, fast bulk dump of patches and parameters, more flexibility in assigning the C1 and C2 controls, and an arpeggiator mode for the JX-10. The update is also made by exchanging the EPROM for one with the new firmware.

While Vecoven still sells EPROMs with the upgraded firmware (V3.09), Fraser no longer supports his own project as he feels there is no longer a market for it: "I have decided therefore to stop selling my JX ROM. It would be daft to go to the bother of upgrading your ROM, and not getting the extra features of Fred's ROM for the reasonable extra cost."

Frederic Vecoven has developed a sophisticated arrangement of simulation tools that allows running of Super JX and display firmware on Apple and Linux platforms. All firmware development took place using these tools, only requiring a laptop during design before final integration testing on instruments.

== Combined hardware and firmware upgrade ==
Building on his firmware rewrite, Frederic Vecoven has also finished a hardware modification. To achieve pulse-width modulation, the JX-10 is equipped with daughter boards and faster CPUs. A rewrite of the firmware makes use of the added processing power to implement additional functions.

Added functionality includes:

- Pulse-Width Modulation, controllable by envelope or LFO
- an additional LFO (LFO2)
- additional LFO wave forms and modulations
- enhanced six-stage envelope generators ENV1 and ENV2 similar to those in the Roland Alpha Juno series
- two additional ADSR envelope generators (ENV3 and ENV4)
- free-running envelopes
- NRPN control of tone parameters, controlling parameters of one tone, or both, in real time

In addition to replacing the old firmware, the upgrade requires a substantial modification of the JX hardware. Each of the two sound boards has to be equipped with an additional PCB that has to be connected with 36 wires soldered to the sound board. The original Intel 8031 CPUs have to be desoldered and replaced by more modern Analog Devices DS80C320 CPUs. Experienced solderers have reported to take several hours to finish the mod.

Vecoven states that the PWM mod makes use of resources already present in the original hardware, so that it can be suspected that the missing PWM capability was scrapped in the later stages of the JX-10 design.

== Display upgrade ==
In 2013 Frederic Vecoven attached a graphic VFD to an MKS-70 using a PIC micro containing firmware to decode the Roland display protocol. It was developed further into a concept that took advantage of additional data and graphic VFD capabilities. Frederic Vecoven handed the project over to Guy Wilkinson in 2015 who developed a replacement display solution with hardware, firmware and detailed fitting guide for the JX-10. The MKS-70 followed shortly after when Serge Pomorski designed the fitting technique on his fully upgraded instrument. The replacement display bypasses the original Roland display hardware and takes advantage of additional data transmitted by the Vecoven firmware to enhance the layout and readability.
