= Roland Juno-106 =

Synthesizer

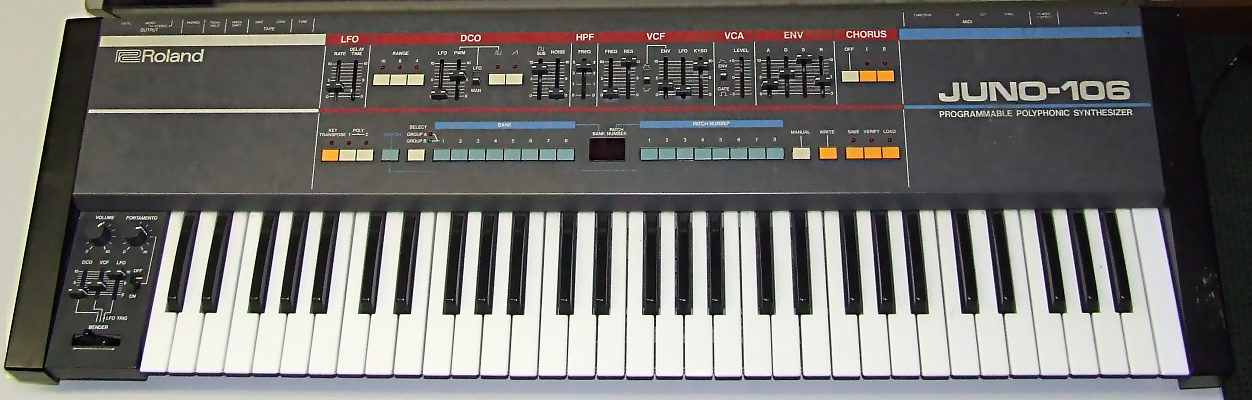
- Manufacturer: Roland
- Dates: February 1984 – 1988

Technical specifications
- Polyphony: 6 voices
- Timbrality: Polyphonic
- Oscillator: 1 DCO per voice (pulse, saw, square and noise)
- LFO: triangle with delay and rate
- Synthesis type: Analog subtractive
- Filter: Analog 24dB/oct resonant low-pass, non-resonant high-pass
- Attenuator: ADSR envelope generator
- Aftertouch expression: No
- Velocity expression: No
- Storage memory: 128 patches
- Effects: Chorus

Input/output
- Keyboard: 61 keys
- External control: MIDI

The Roland Juno-106 is a synthesizer released by Roland Corporation in February 1984.

== Features ==
The Juno-106 is a polyphonic synthesizer with six voices. It is an analog synthesizer but with digitally controlled oscillators and chorus effects. Whereas its predecessor, the Juno-60, has 56 patches, the Juno-106 has 128. It introduced Roland's performance lever for pitch bends and modulation, which became a standard feature of Roland instruments. It also adds MIDI and was one of the first analog synthesizers to allow users to sequence parameter changes.

== Impact ==
Artists who have used the Juno-106 include Jacob Mann, Vince Clarke, Frankie Goes to Hollywood, Chvrches, Leftfield, William Orbit, Paul Frick from Tangerine Dream, Underworld, Reel 2 Real, Jam & Spoon, and Vangelis.

The Juno-106 was Roland's bestselling synthesizer until the release of the Roland D-50 later in the decade. It remains one of the bestselling synthesizers. In 1985, Roland released two versions with built-in speakers: the Juno-106S and the HS60 Synth Plus.

The synth's popularity continues to the present day, especially with EDM and artists such as Tame Impala, Daft Punk, Calvin Harris, Armin van Buuren, Mark Ronson, and Caribou among many others.

== Hardware re-issues and recreations ==
The Roland MKS-7 Super Quartet, a multi-timbral synth module with dedicated sections for each part, used the same 80017 filter chip as the Juno-106 for the bass section.

In 2015, Roland released the JU-06 sound module (as part of their "Boutique" series), a digital recreation of the Juno-106 using Roland's digital Analog Circuit Behaviour (ACB) technology. It is battery powered, has 4-voices and 23 parameters controlled from the front panel. It cost $299 at the time of the release.

in 2016, Behringer released the Deepmind-12, an analog synthesizer inspired by the Juno-106 which features 12 voices. It was priced at $999 at the time of release. In 2020, developer Momo Müller released an unofficial PC MIDI editor with the interface of June-106, called the Deepmind - Juno-106 Editor.

In 2019, Roland released the JU-06A (an upgrade to their original JU-06 module), which is a digitally based synthesizer combining the JUNO-60 and JUNO-106. It has the continuous high-pass filter of the 106, the envelope-controllable pulse-width-modulation of the 60, and the filter of both switchable from the front panel. It cost $399 at the time of the release.

Roland released the Juno-X in 2022, a modern synth featuring digital emulations of the Juno-60 and Juno-106 as well as an additional Juno-X model that features a supersaw waveform, velocity sensitivity and an Alpha-Juno style pitch envelope control. The Juno X's control panel design directly references the controls of the Juno-106 while the sound engine follows on from the Jupiter-X and Jupiter-Xm modern digital synths.

== Software emulations ==
In 2017, Roland released some software synthesizers in the cloud, including Cloud Juno-106. The cloud subscription cost $240/yr at the time.

In June 2020, Roland released Zenology plugins for Roland synths, which includes a Juno-106 emulator.

In 2020, Cherry Audio released the DCO-106 plugin, a juiced-up version of the Juno-106 which was priced at $39 USD in 2020.

The Kayrock KR-106 project has code and documentation for an open-source virtual analogue synthesizer inspired by the Roland Juno-106. It provides technical details on the instrument’s design, including oscillator, filter, and modulation implementation, along with development notes and supporting material.
