= Low-frequency oscillation =

Means of modulation in music production

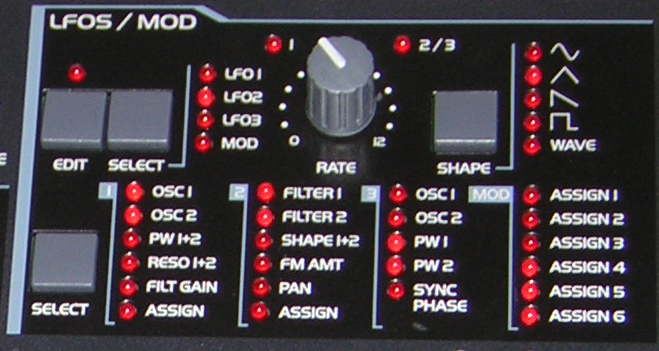
LFO section of an Access Virus C series synthesizer

Low-frequency oscillation (LFO) is an electronic frequency that is usually below 20 Hz and creates a rhythmic pulse or sweep. This is used to modulate musical equipment such as synthesizers to create audio effects such as vibrato, tremolo and phasing.

== History ==
Low-frequency oscillation was introduced with modular synthesizers of the 1960s, such as the Moog synthesizer. Often the LFO effect was accidental, as there were myriad configurations that could be "patched" by the synth operator. LFOs have since appeared in some form on almost every synthesizer. More recently other electronic musical instruments, such as samplers and software synthesizers, have included LFOs to increase their sound alteration capabilities.

== Overview ==
The primary oscillator circuits of a synthesizer are used to create the audio signals. An LFO is a secondary oscillator that operates at a significantly lower frequency than other oscillators, typically below 20 Hz — that is, below the range of human hearing. The frequencies generated by LFOs are used as control signals which modulate another component's value, changing the output sound without introducing another source. Like a standard oscillator, this usually takes the form of a periodic waveform, such as a sine, sawtooth, triangle or square wave. Also like a standard oscillator, LFOs can incorporate any number of waveform types, including user-defined wavetables, rectified waves and random signals.

Using a low-frequency oscillation signal as a means of modulating another signal introduces complexities into the resulting sound, such that a variety of effects can be achieved. The specifics vary greatly depending on the type of modulation, the relative frequencies of the LFO signal and the signal being modulated, et cetera.

== Uses ==
Tremolo
A low-frequency oscillator modulating volume to create a tremolo effect.

Ripple Effect
A high-rate low-frequency oscillator modulating cutoff frequency to create a ripple effect.

Wobble Bass
A low-frequency oscillator modulating cutoff frequency to create a wobble bass effect.

An LFO can be routed to control, for example, the frequency of the audio oscillator, its phase, stereo panning, filter frequency, or amplification. When routed to control pitch, an LFO creates vibrato. When an LFO modulates amplitude (volume), it creates tremolo. On most synthesizers and sound modules, LFOs feature several controllable parameters, which often include a variety of different waveforms, a rate control, routing options (as described above), a tempo sync feature, and an option to control how much the LFO will modulate the audio signal. LFOs can also be summed and set to different frequencies to create continuously changing slow moving waveforms, and when linked to multiple parameters of a sound, can give the impression that the sound is "alive".

Electronic musicians use LFO for a variety of applications. They may be used to add simple vibrato or tremolo to a melody, or for more complex applications such as triggering gate envelopes, or controlling the rate of arpeggiation.

Differences between LFO rates also account for a number of commonly heard effects in modern music. A very low rate can be used to modulate a filter's cutoff frequency, thereby providing the characteristic gradual sensation of the sound becoming clearer or closer to the listener. Alternatively, a high rate can be used for bizarre 'rippling' sound effects (indeed, another important use of LFO is for various sound effects used in films). Dubstep and drum and bass are forms of electronic music that employ frequent use of LFOs, often synchronized to the tempo of the track, for bass sounds that have a "wobble" effect. For example, by modulating the cutoff frequency of a low-pass filter to create a distinctive opening-and-closing effect. Due to the popularization of these genres, the LFO wobble is now being found in other forms of electronic dance music such as house music. LFO is commonly used in future bass music to enhance synthesisers, along with side-chain.

== In popular culture ==
The British electronic music group LFO take their name directly from the low-frequency oscillator.
