= List of Arturia products =

This is a list of products manufactured by Arturia, a French electronics company that designs and manufactures audio interfaces and electronic musical instruments, including software synthesizers, drum machines, analog synthesizers, digital synthesizers, MIDI controllers, sequencers, and mobile apps.

Arturia is a French electronics company founded in 1999 and based in Grenoble, France. The company designs and manufactures audio interfaces and electronic musical instruments, including software synthesizers, drum machines, analog synthesizers, digital synthesizers, MIDI controllers, sequencers, and mobile apps.

== Products ==
The company's product line includes software synthesizers, software bundles, hardware synthesizers, MIDI keyboards and sequencers, mobile apps, and other audio equipment and controllers.

=== Subtractive synthesis ===
- ARP2600 V3, a recreation of the ARP 2600
- CS-80 V4, a recreation of the Yamaha CS-80
- Mini V3, a recreation of the Moog Minimoog
- SEM V2, a recreation of the Oberheim SEM
- Matrix-12 V2, a recreation of the Oberheim Matrix 12
- Prophet V, a recreation of the Sequential Circuits Prophet-5
- Jup-8 V, a recreation of the Roland Jupiter 8
- Jun-6 V, a recreation of the Juno 60
- Synthi V, a recreation of the EMS VCS 3
- SQ80 V, a recreation of the Ensoniq SQ-80
- OP-Xa, a recreation of the Oberheim OB-Xa
- Acid V, a recreation of the Roland TB-303
- Korg MS-20 V, a recreation of the Ms-20 made with Korg
- Jup-8000 V, a recreation of the Roland JP-8000

=== Additive synthesis ===
- Buchla Easel V, a recreation of the music easel from Buchla Electronic Musical Instruments
- DX7 V, a recreation of the Yamaha DX7
- CZ V, a recreation inspired by Casio's CZ synthesizers linet
- Synthx V, a recreation of the Elka Synthx

=== Keyboard emulations ===
- VOX Continental V2, a recreation of the Vox Continental organ
- Farfisa V, a recreation of a Farfisa Organ
- Wurli V2, a recreation of the Wurlitzer electronic piano
- Solina V2, a recreation of the ARP String Ensemble
- Stage-73 V2, a recreation of the range of Rhodes electronic pianos
- Clavinet V, a recreation of the Hohner Clavinet
- B-3 V2, a recreation of the Hammond B3 tonewheel organ
- Piano V3, recreates the sound of a piano via physical modelling
- CP-70 V, emulates the sound of the Yamaha CP-70, an electric piano.

=== Samplers ===
- Emulator II V, a recreation of the E-mu Emulator
- Synclavier V, a recreation of the New England Digital Synclavier
- CMI V, a recreation of the Fairlight CMI
- Mellotron V, a recreation of the Mellotron

=== Miscellaneous plug-ins ===
- Pigments, a software synthesizer with wavetable, virtual analog, sample and harmonic engines
- Analog Lab V
- Vocoder V, a vocoder emulation
- Pure Lofi
- MiniFreak V
- MiniBrute V
- Augmented Strings
- Augmented Voices
- Augmented Grand Piano
- Augmented Brass
- Augmented Mallets Play
- Augmented Woodwinds
- Augmented Yangtze

=== Software effects ===
==== Filters ====
- Mini-Filter, a filter emulation of Moog's ladder filter with sequencing and modulation sources added
- M12-Filter, a filter emulation of Oberheim Matrix-12 filter, based on the CEM 3372 with sequencing and modulation sources added
- SEM-Filter, a filter emulation of the Oberheim SEM filter with sequencing and modulation sources added
- EQ SITRAL-295, an emulation of the Siemens Sitral equalisers

==== Dynamics ====
- Comp VCA-65, a VCA-style compressor emulating the DBX 165A
- Comp FET-76, an emulation of the Universal Audio 1176LN Peak Limiter
- Comp TUBE-STA, an emulation of the Gates STA-Level vacuum tube compressor
- Bus FORCE, a bus effects unit made by Arturia combining an equaliser a compressor and a distortion unit
- Bus TRANSIENT, a transient shaper made by Arturia
- Mix Drums, a mixing effect chain made to process drums.

==== Time-based effects ====
- Chorus JUN-6, an emulation of the chorus effect of the Roland Juno-60
- Chorus DIMENSION-D, an emulation of Roland Dimension-D chorus unit
- Phaser BI-TRON, a recreation of the Mu-tron Bi-Phase
- Flanger BL-20, a recreation of the Bel BF-20 Flanger
- Pitch SHIFTER-910, a recreation of Eventide's H910
- Rotary CLS-222, a recreation of the Leslie speaker

==== Reverbs and delays ====
- Delay TAPE-201, a tape-style delay emulating the RE-201
- Delay MEMORY-BRIGADE, a bucket brigade style delay based on Electro-Harmonix's Deluxe Memory Man
- Delay ETERNITY, a digital delay designed by Arturia
- Rev PLATE-140, a plate-style reverb, emulating the EMT 140
- Rev INTENSITY, a digital reverb designed by Arturia
- Rev SPRING-636, a spring-style reverb emulating Grampian's reverberation unit type 636
- Rev LX-24, a digital reverb emulating Lexicon's 224 digital reverb
- Efx FRAGMENTS, a granular effect designed by Arturia
- Efx AMBIENT, a fft and FDN-based reverb designed by Arturia

==== Preamplifiers ====
- Pre 1973, a recreation of the AMS Neve preamp with a pair of parametric equalizers
- Pre TridA, a recreation of the preamps and the equalizers found in the Trident A Range mixing consoles
- Pre V76, a recreation of Telefunken's equalizers and preamplifiers
- Tape MELLO-FI, a tape style preamp/saturation module emulating characteristics of Mellotron V
- Tape J-37, an emulation of various Studer tape recorders

==== Distortions ====
- Dist COLDFIRE, a multi distortion unit
- Dist Tube CULTURE, a recreation of the Culture Vulture tube saturation
- Dist OPAMP-21, a recreation of Tech 21's SansAmp

=== Audio interfaces ===
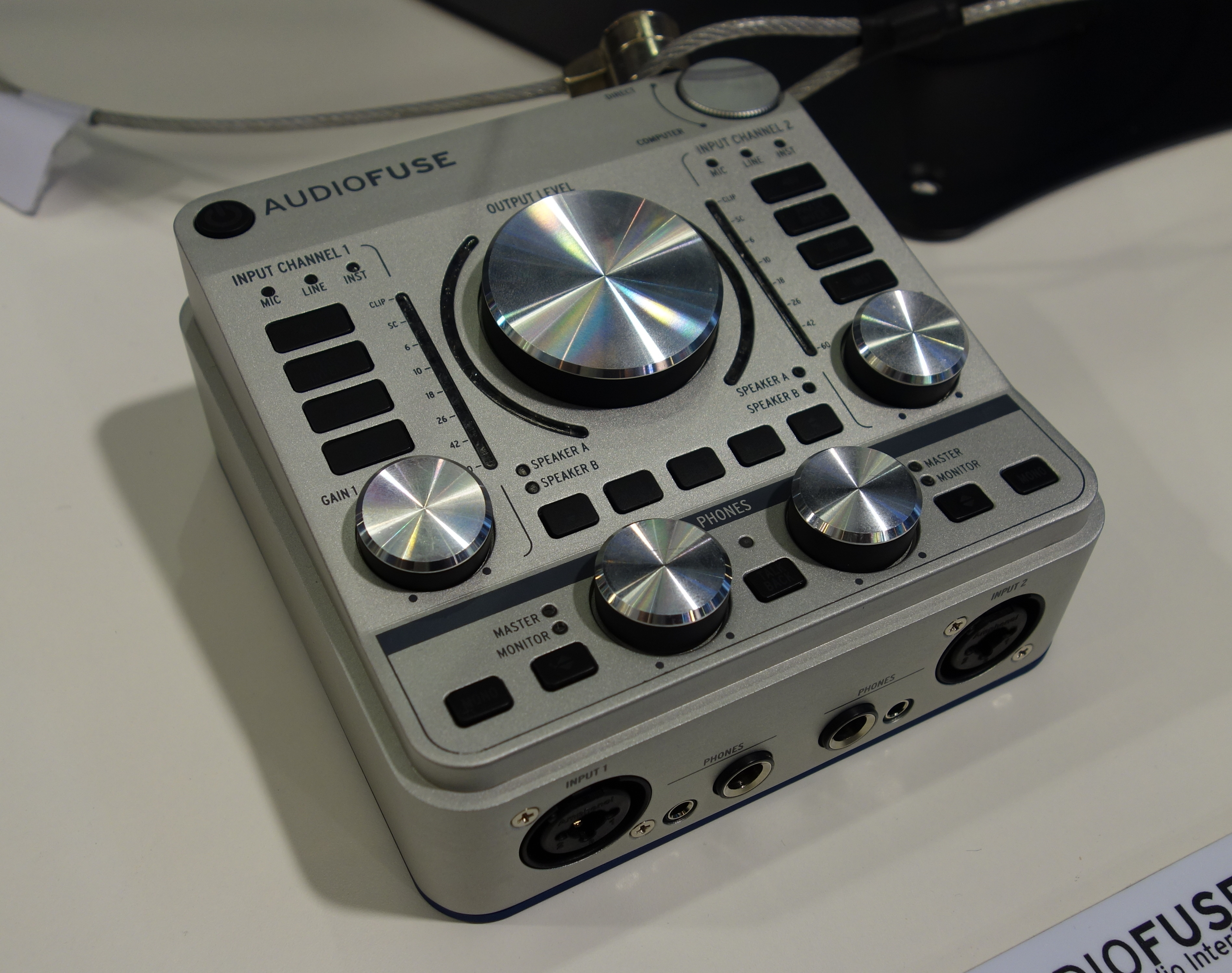
Arturia AudioFuse (2015) audio interface

- MiniFuse 1/2/4
- AudioFuse /AudioFuse 8PRE /AudioFuse Studio

=== MIDI controllers ===
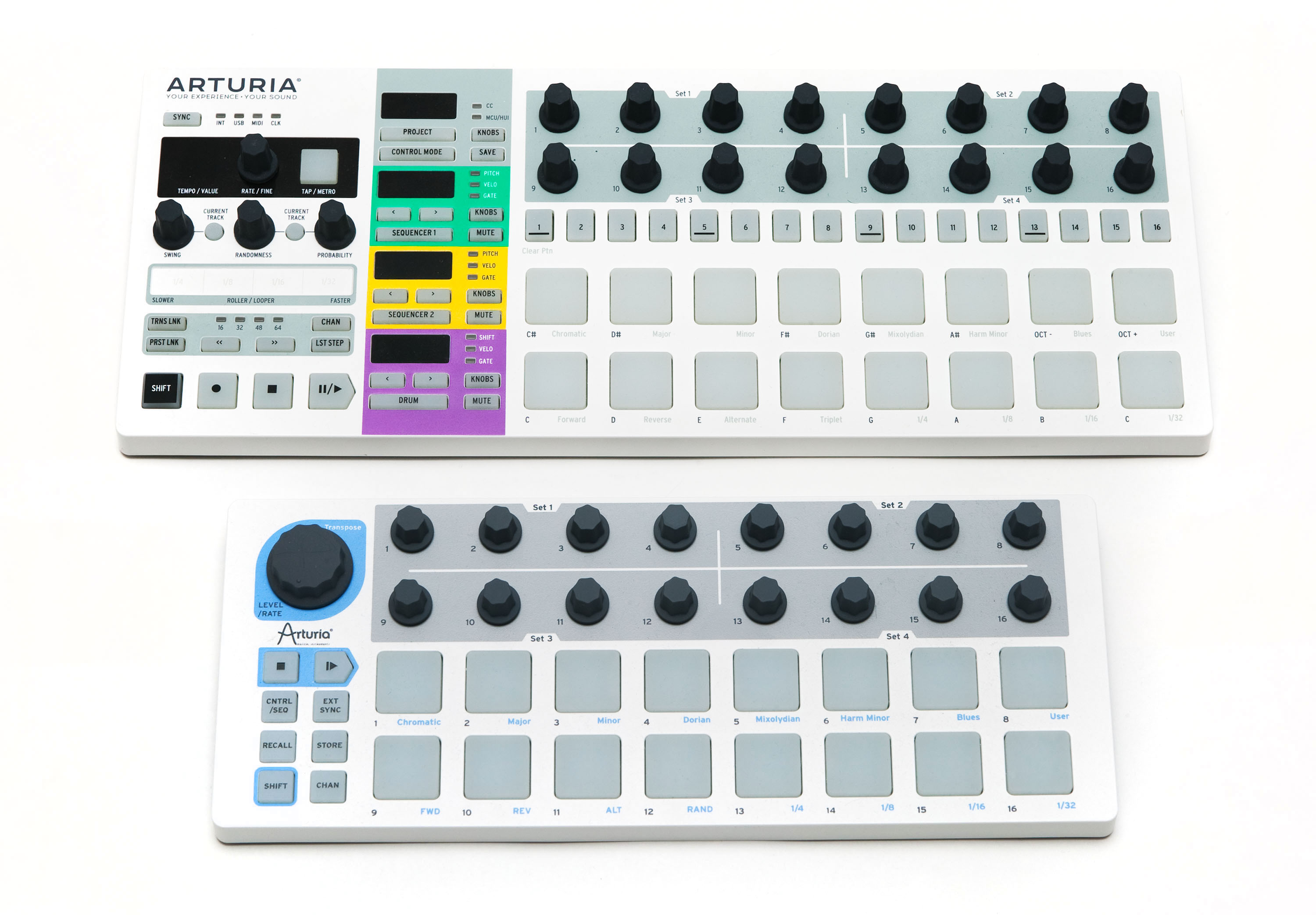
Arturia BeatStep Pro (2015) and BeatStep (2014) controllers

- KeyStep /KeyStep 37 /KeyStep Pro
- BeatStep/BeatStep Pro
- MiniLab MK III
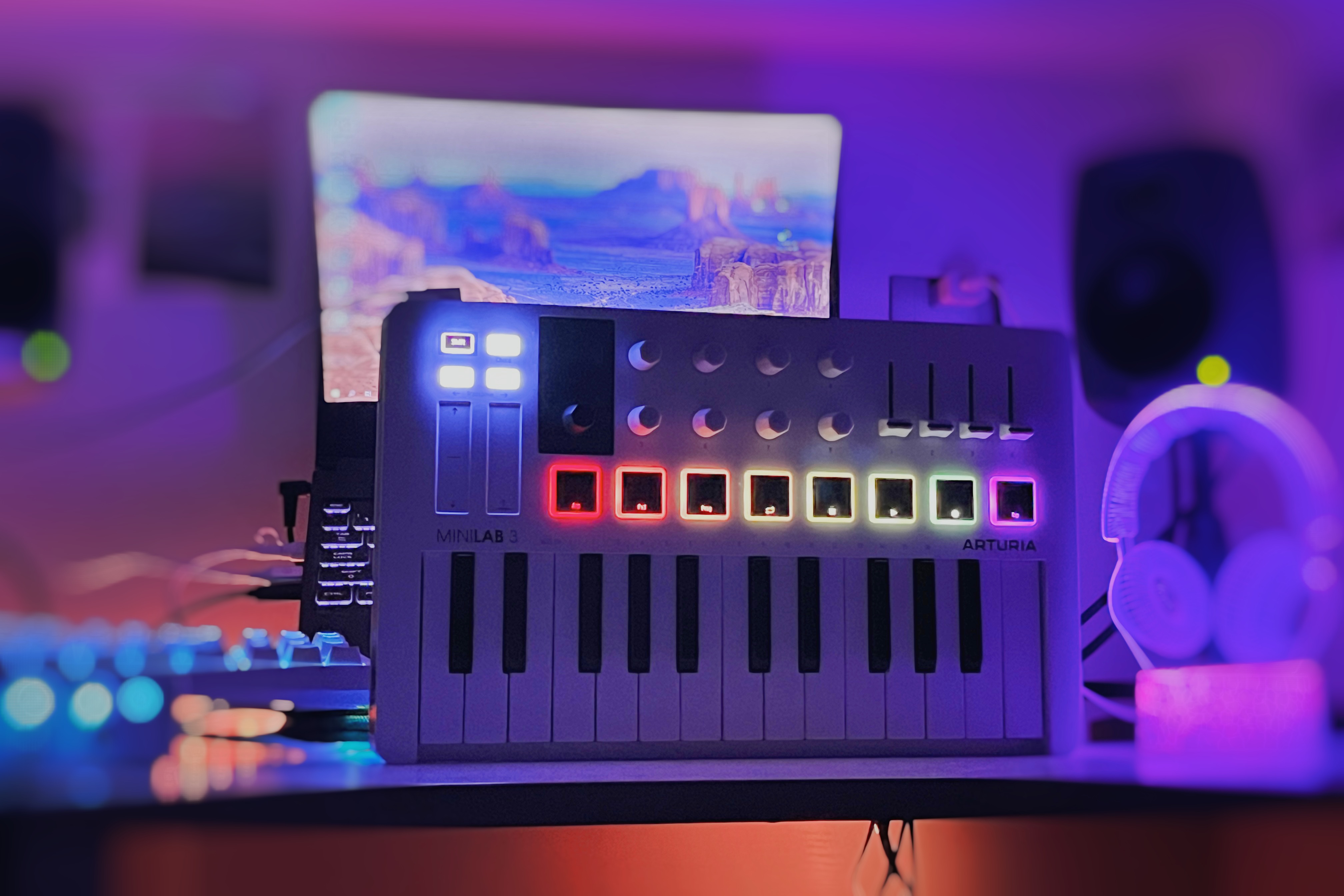
  Arturia MiniLab 3
- MicroLab
- KeyLab Essential 49/61/88
- KeyLab 49/61/88 MK III

=== Hardware synths ===
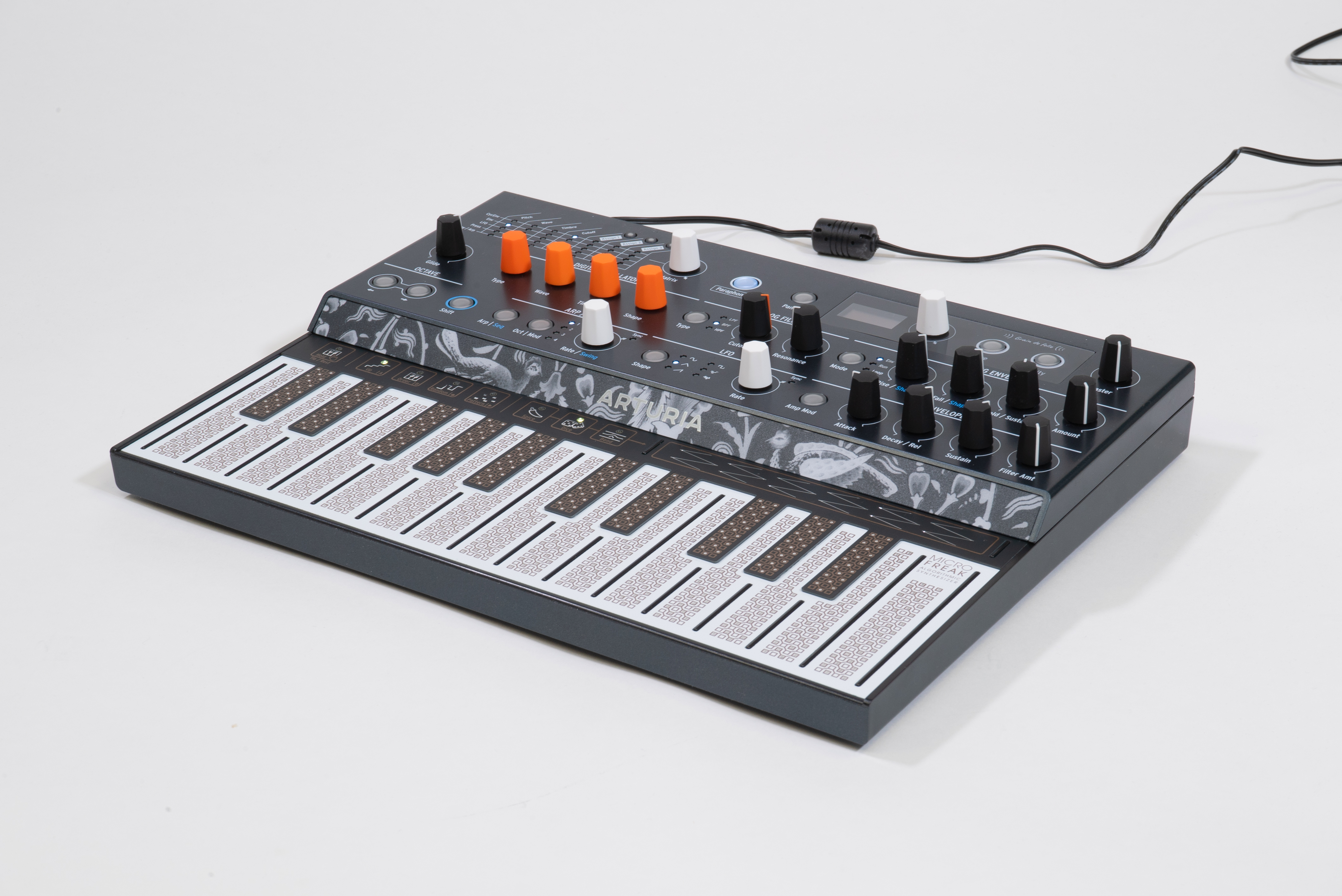
Arturia MicroFreak (2019)

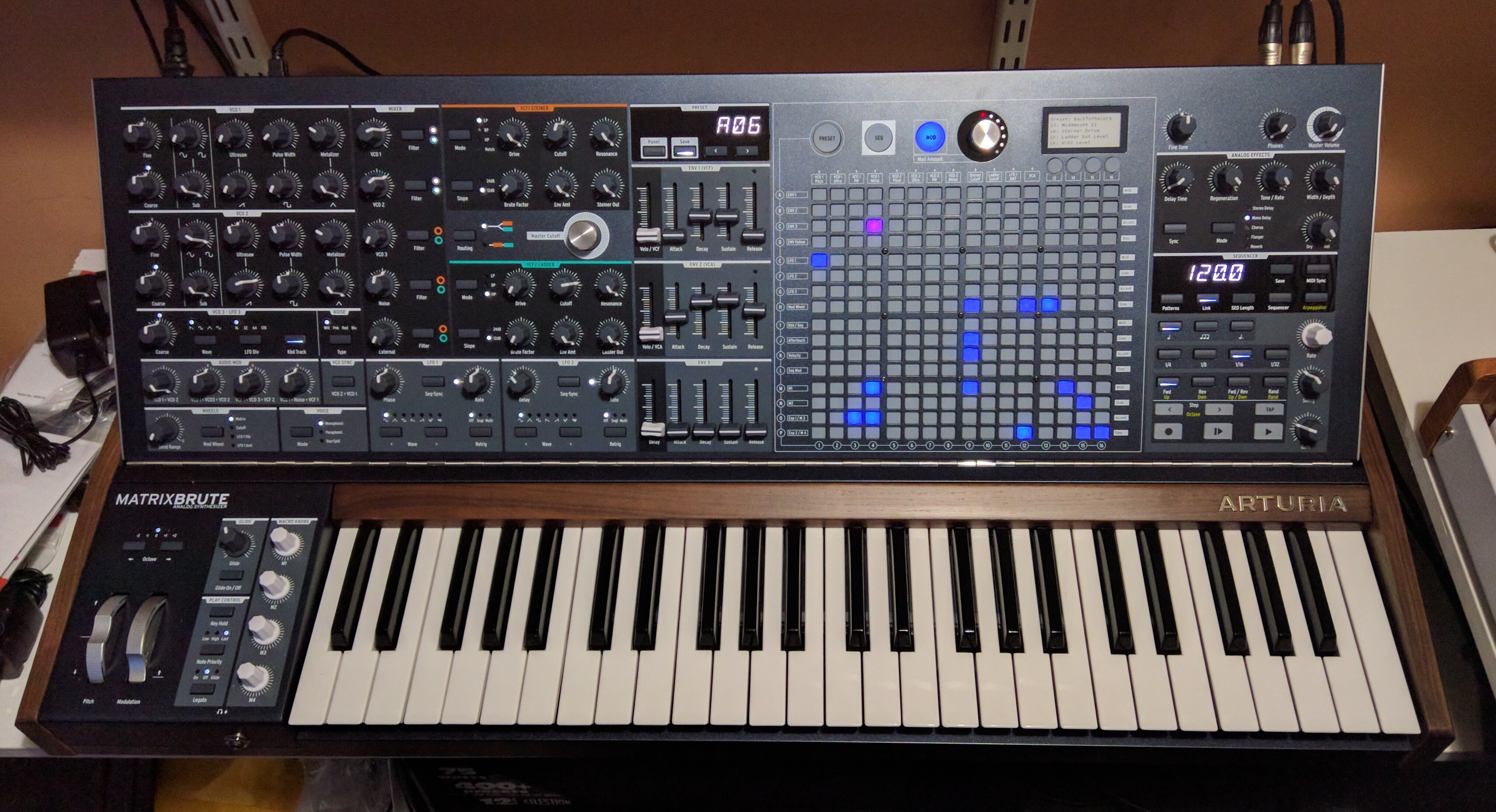
Arturia MatrixBrute (2016)

While Arturia is mostly known for their software synths, Arturia is also making hardware synthesizers, including their analog Brute series and digital Freak series.

- Origin (2009)
- MiniBrute (2012)
- MicroBrute (2014)
- MatrixBrute (2017)
- DrumBrute (2017)
- MiniBrute 2/2S (2018)
- DrumBrute Impact (2018)
- MicroFreak (2019)
- PolyBrute (2021)

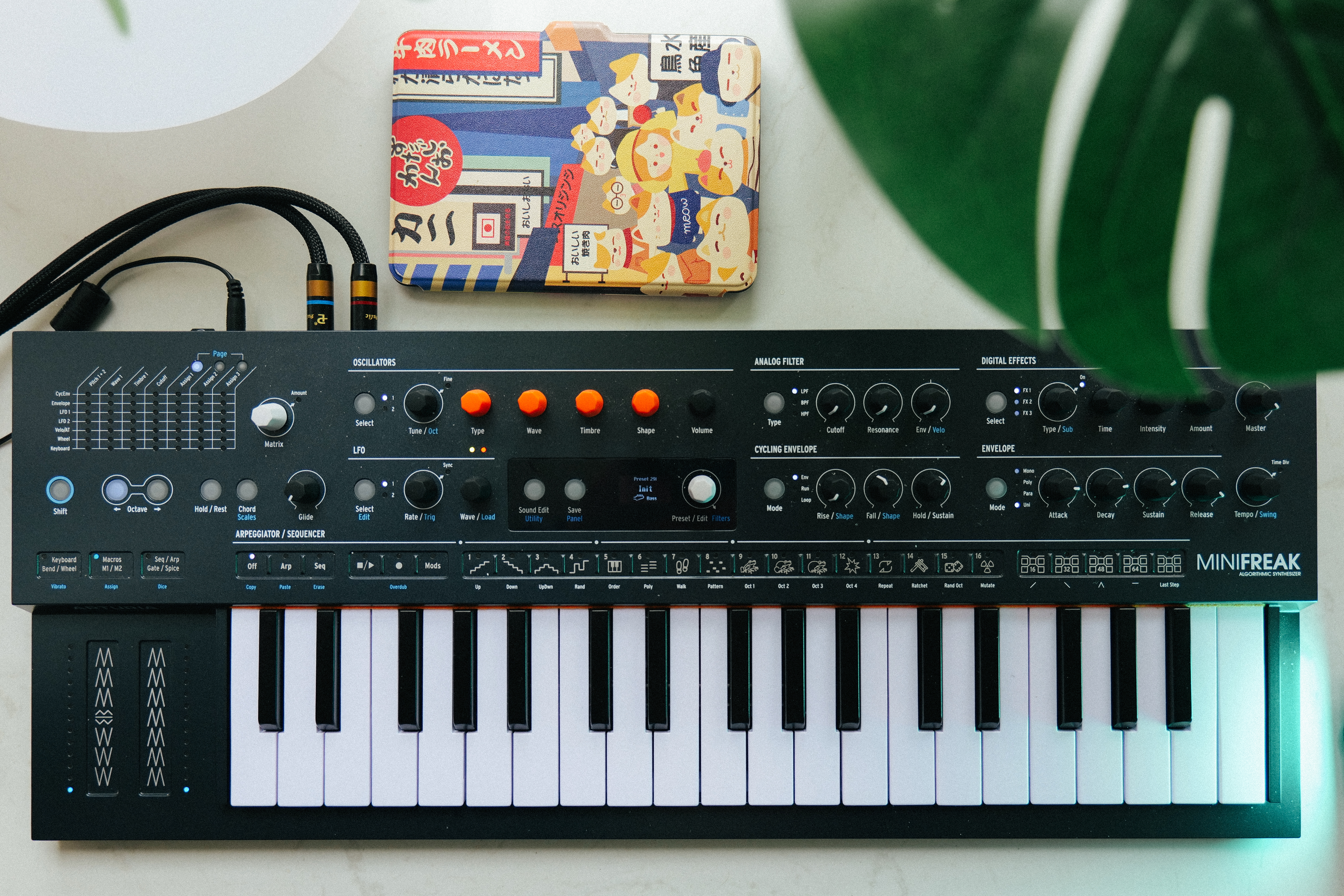
Arturia MiniFreak (2023)

- MiniFreak (2022)

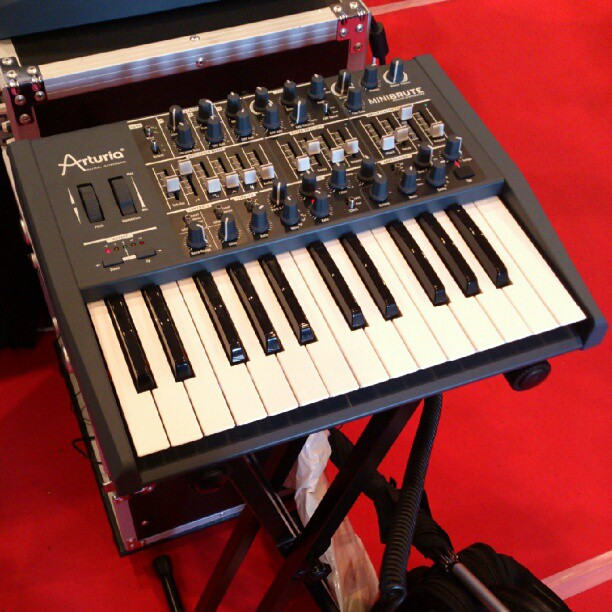
Arturia MiniBrute (2012

- PolyBrute 12 (2024)
- Astrolab 88/61/37 (2024)

=== Miscellaneous ===
- Spark
- SparkLE
- iMini
- iSem
- iProphet
- iSpark
