= Nscor =

nscor
- Electronic music by Curtis Roads
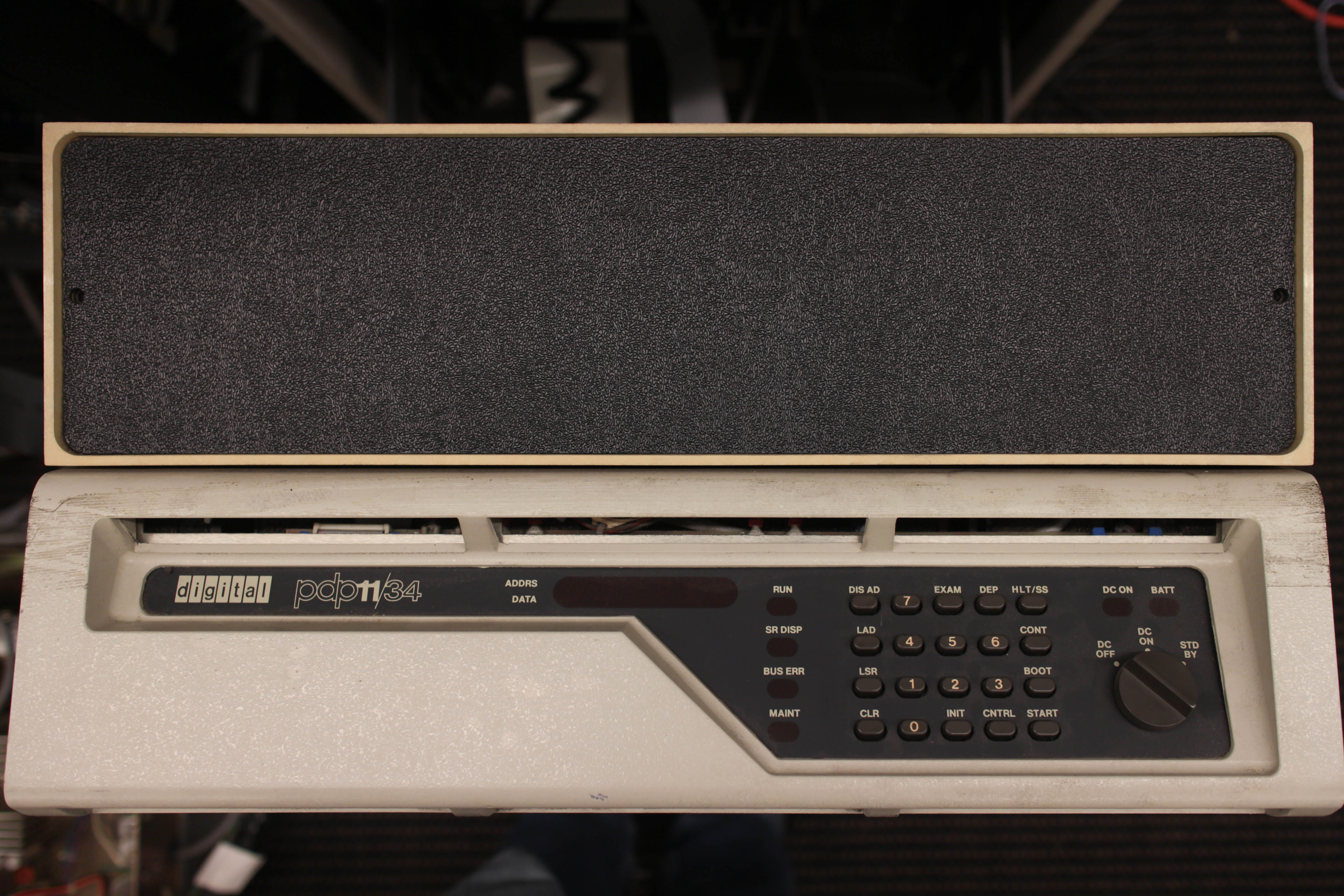
- A PDP-11/34, one of the computers that were used in the realization of the piece at MIT Experimental Music Studio.
- Composed: 1980, rev 1986

Premiere
- Date: October 1980
- Location: Varese, Italy

nscor is a 1980 electronic composition by Curtis Roads. The piece is built upon multiple synthesis methods and was composed at different studios during a period of five years. It was included on the 1986 compilation album New Computer Music released by WERGO, and the inclusion of the piece on the album was generally positively received by critics.

== Background ==
nscor is the third piece in a cycle of four works which Roads composed from 1975 to 1981. (Note: The other works in the cycle are Construction (1975-76), Objet (1977), and Field (1981).) Composed during a time of rapidly changing computer music technology, the composition has been completed in several versions. Due to the compositional process, no full score exists for the piece. The piece is built upon audio synthesized using multiple techniques which Roads realized at six studios for a period of five years, including brief passages using granular synthesis. Roads chose this process deliberately to avoid relying on a single synthesis technique, describing his goal for the composition as "try[ing] to expand the range of sound color toward a polychromatic palette".

The mixing and editing of the source material into the finished piece was done at the MIT Experimental Music Studio and Suntreader Studios during March–November 1980. An earlier revision of the piece from September premiered at the second Concorso Internazionale Luigi Russolo, to meet a submission deadline. The September version was longer, at 10 minutes and 41 seconds; the November version was shortened to 8 minutes and 45 seconds. The November version premiered at the International Computer Music Conference at Queens College, City University of New York on November 13, 1980.

Roads remixed the piece in August 1986 at Studio Strada in Cambridge. This version was included on an album of various composers titled New Computer Music, released by WERGO in 1987.

== Reception ==
The inclusion of the 1986 edition on New Computer Music, was generally positively received by reviewers. Writing for Keyboard, Jim Aikin described the piece positively as offering a variety of sounds. Allan Kozinn's review of the album for The New York Times described the piece along with James Dashow's Sequence Symbols from the same compilation album, as being of "the more traditional bleep and buzz school", but noted that both pieces unfold dramatically with a sense of direction. In his review for the Computer Music Journal, Robert Rowe opined that the piece is not only interesting for its own merits, but also in that it was composed using a variety of techniques during a time where FM synthesis dominated. However, Rowe described the linear presentation of the piece as "unrelieved monophonic", and noted that "some contrapuntal use of the material may have made the work even more compelling".

The piece has been listed in recommended listening sections in books covering electronic music, such as Andrew Hugill's The Digital Musician and Daniel Warner's Live Wires.
