= Loren Rush =

American classical composer (born 1935)

Loren Rush (born August 23, 1935) is an American composer.

== Life and career ==
His works include the drone piece Hard Music (1970) for three amplified pianos. The piece features no melodic figuration but rather clouds created by only one note, the low D above cello C, repeated quickly enough by each player to be heard as nearly continuous. The surface results from the composite rhythms of percussive attacks and the interplay of partials brought out through the rhythms and fortissimo dynamics. The fifth through the ninth partials are particularly easy to hear and the louder passages feature higher partials.

In 1957, he formed an improvisation group with Terry Riley, Pauline Oliveros, Robert Erickson, and Bill Butler with a focus an aleatoric and improvisational techniques. "
