= Arturia MicroFreak =

Synthesizer

MicroFreak
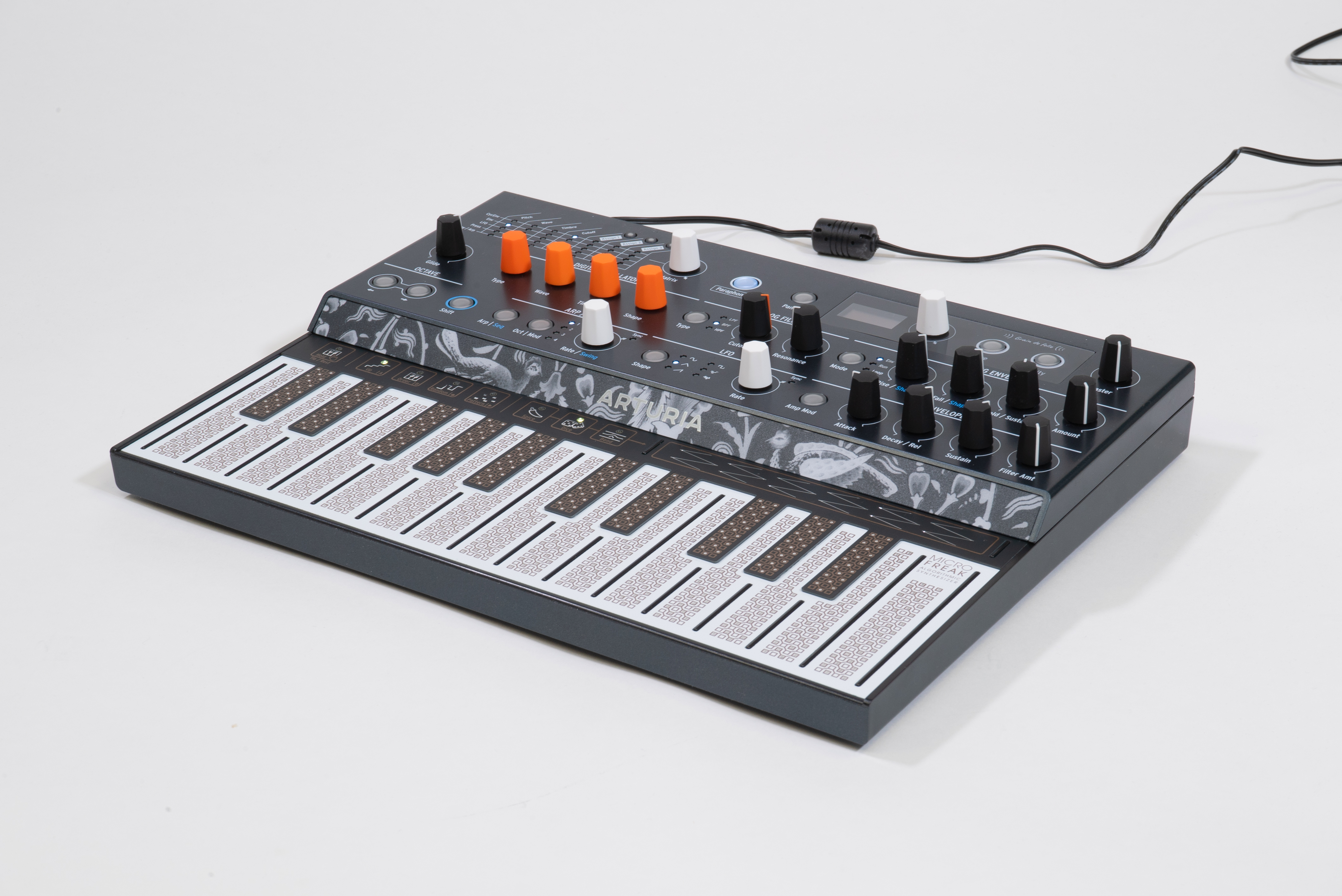
- The MicroFreak at the NAMM Show
- Manufacturer: Arturia

Technical specifications
- Polyphony: 4 (paraphonic)
- Timbrality: Monotimbral
- Oscillator: Single Multi-Mode Digital Oscillator
- LFO: Multi-shape LFO
- Synthesis type: See Sound Engines
- Filter: Multi-mode VCF
- Attenuator: Cycling envelope, ASR envelope and LFO
- Aftertouch expression: Polyphonic Aftertouch

Input/output
- Keyboard: 2 Octave PCB
- External control: Sends and receives MIDI, outputs CV

MicroFreak Filter Sweeps
A demonstration of the MicroFreak's filter sweeping with varying resonance, including self-oscillation.

The MicroFreak is a synthesizer manufactured by French music technology company Arturia and released in 2019. Described as a "Hybrid Experimental Synthesizer", it uses 22 digital sound engines (algorithms) to synthesize raw tones. This digital oscillator is then fed into a multi-mode analog filter, giving the MicroFreak its hybrid sounds.

== Sound engines ==
The MicroFreak has 22 distinct sound engines (as of the 5.0 update), which are:

- Basic Waves – a standard synth voice using traditional waveforms
- Super Wave – a group of detuned waves (like a supersaw),
- Harmonic – a form of additive synthesis where you set volumes of frequencies individually,
- Karplus-Strong – a physical modelling system to replicate string sounds,
- Wavetable – a method of synthesis where the waveform transitions through a table of different waveforms,
- Noise – various types of noise and static.
- Virtual Analogue – a standard subtractive synth voice,
- Waveshaper – a triangle wave that is repeatedly wavefolded,
- Frequency Modulation (two operators) – a method of synthesis where a wave modulates the frequency of another wave,
- Formant – a form of granular synthesis,
- Chords – an engine that plays groups of notes paraphonically,
- Speech – a vocal synthesizer,
- Modal – a physical modelling engine that replicates the sound of hollow objects,
- Bass – another waveshaping algorithm specifically for basslines,
- Harm – a mixture of waveshaping and additive synthesis,
- SawX – a supersaw being phase modulated,
- Vocoder – a voice transformer similar to a talkbox,
- User Wavetable – an engine to use your own wavetables,
- Sample – an engine that plays back loaded samples,
- Scan Grain – a granular synthesizer that scans through a whole sample,
- Cloud Grain – a granular synthesizer that creates overlapping grains from a sample.
- Hit Grain – a granular synthesizer that creates percussive sounds from a sample.

Of those, 12 are made by Arturia (Basic Waves, Super Wave, Harmonic, Karplus-Strong and Wavetable, Noise, Vocoder, User Wavetable, Sample, Scan Grain, Cloud Grain, and Hit Grain), 7 are made by Mutable Instruments (Virtual Analogue, Waveshaper, Two operator FM, Formant, Chords, Speech and Modal) from their "Plaits" eurorack module, and the remaining 3 are made by Noise Engineering.

== Firmware updates ==
Arturia made available user installable firmware updates for the MicroFreak with additional features and improvements in the years after the original release.

- 1.0 – MicroFreak released with this firmware
- 2.0 – Added noise engine, chord mode and scale quantisation
- 2.1.3 – Added vocoder engine. Vocoder edition released with this firmware.
- 3.0 – Added noise engineering oscillators, unison mode and more preset slots
- 4.0 – Added user wavetable engine and 64 more preset slots
- 5.0 – Added sample and grain engines, 128 more preset slots, and a sample and hold mode for keybed modulation. The Stellar edition released with this firmware.

== Variations ==
It received a limited edition white Vocoder design in 2020.

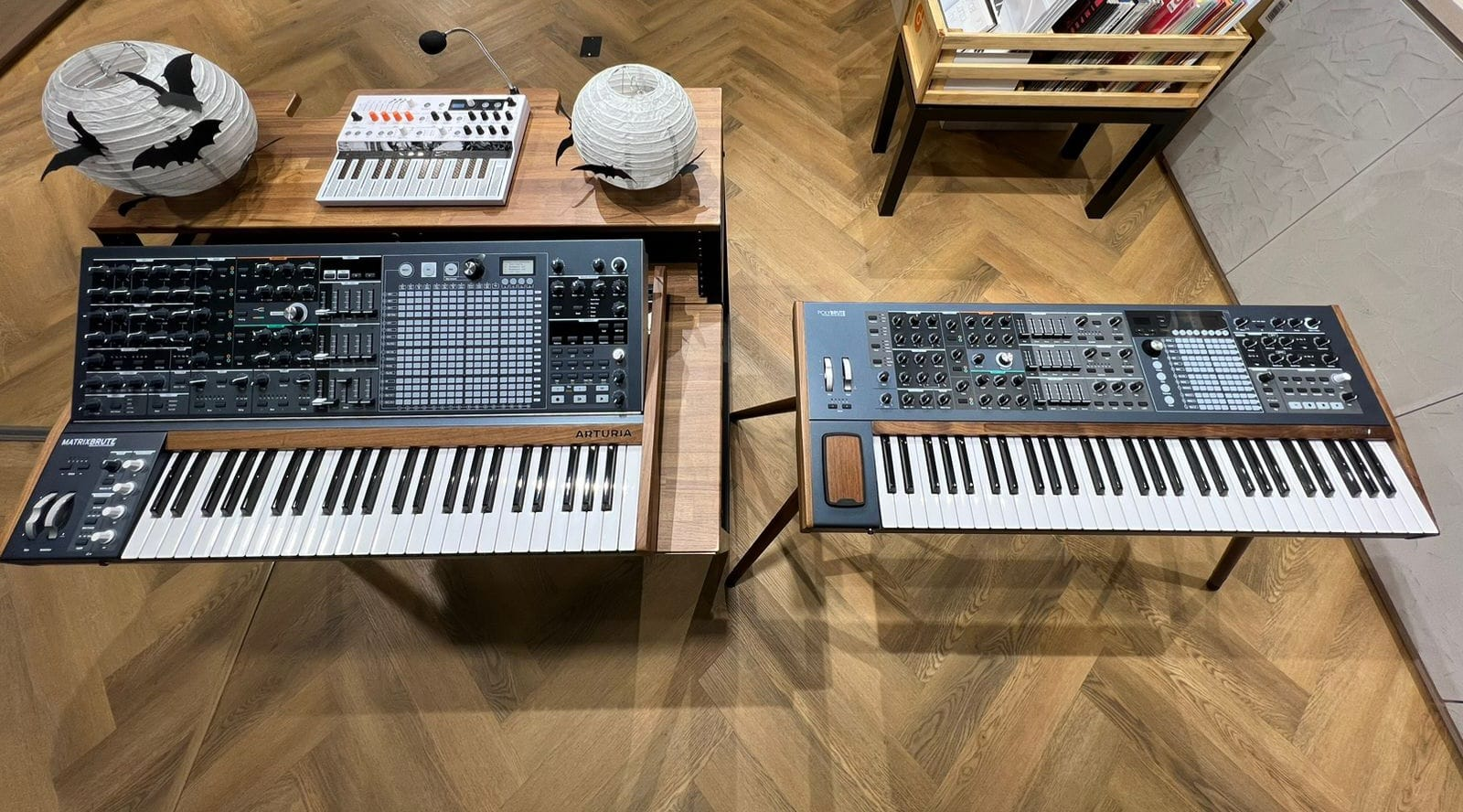
MicroFreak Vocoder (top left in white) is located above a MatrixBrute (bottom left)

== Reception ==
It is considered by some to be one of the best value for money synthesizers of modern times. According to the music production website MusicTech it has "an enormous amount to offer and will really reward exploratory use". The MicroFreak was popular due to its many sound engines and modulation options. The MicroFreak received 9/10 from MusicTech (MusicTech Choice Award); and 9/10 from MusicRadar.

== See also ==
- Arturia MiniBrute – another synthesizer by the same company
