= Keystep =

Keyboard controller manufactured by Arturia

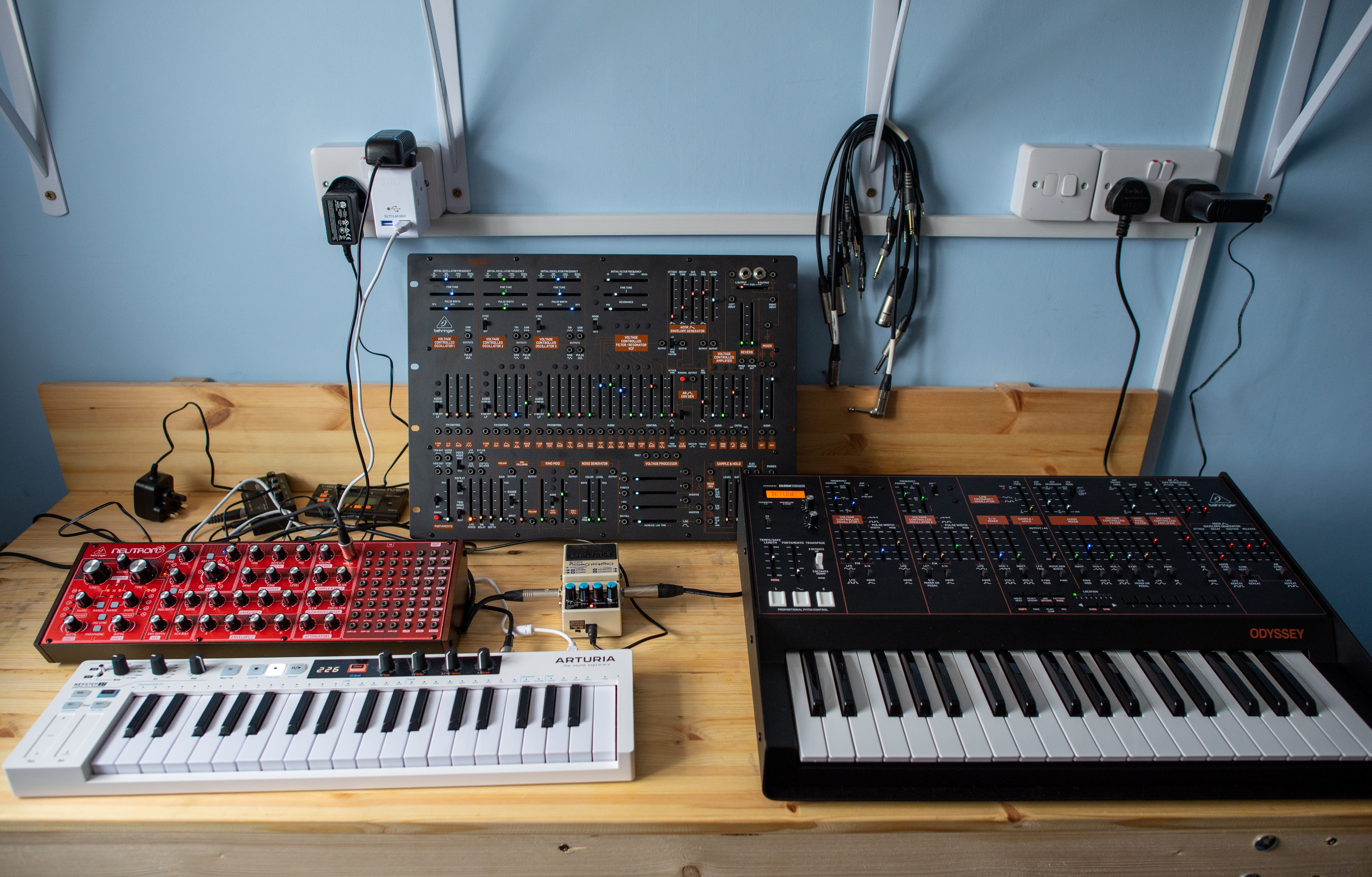
- The KeyStep 37 (bottom left) with various synthesisers
- Manufacturer: Arturia

Technical specifications
- Polyphony: eight
- Aftertouch expression: yes
- Velocity expression: yes

Input/output
- Keyboard: 32
- Left-hand control: pitch bend and mod strips
- External control: MIDI and CV

The Keystep (alternatively capitalised KeyStep) is a keyboard MIDI controller series manufactured by the French music technology company Arturia since 2016. The keyboard produces both MIDI and control voltage (CV) signals. The Keystep also includes a sequencer and an arpeggiator. Further products were made in the Keystep series: the Keystep Pro and Keystep 37.

== Release ==
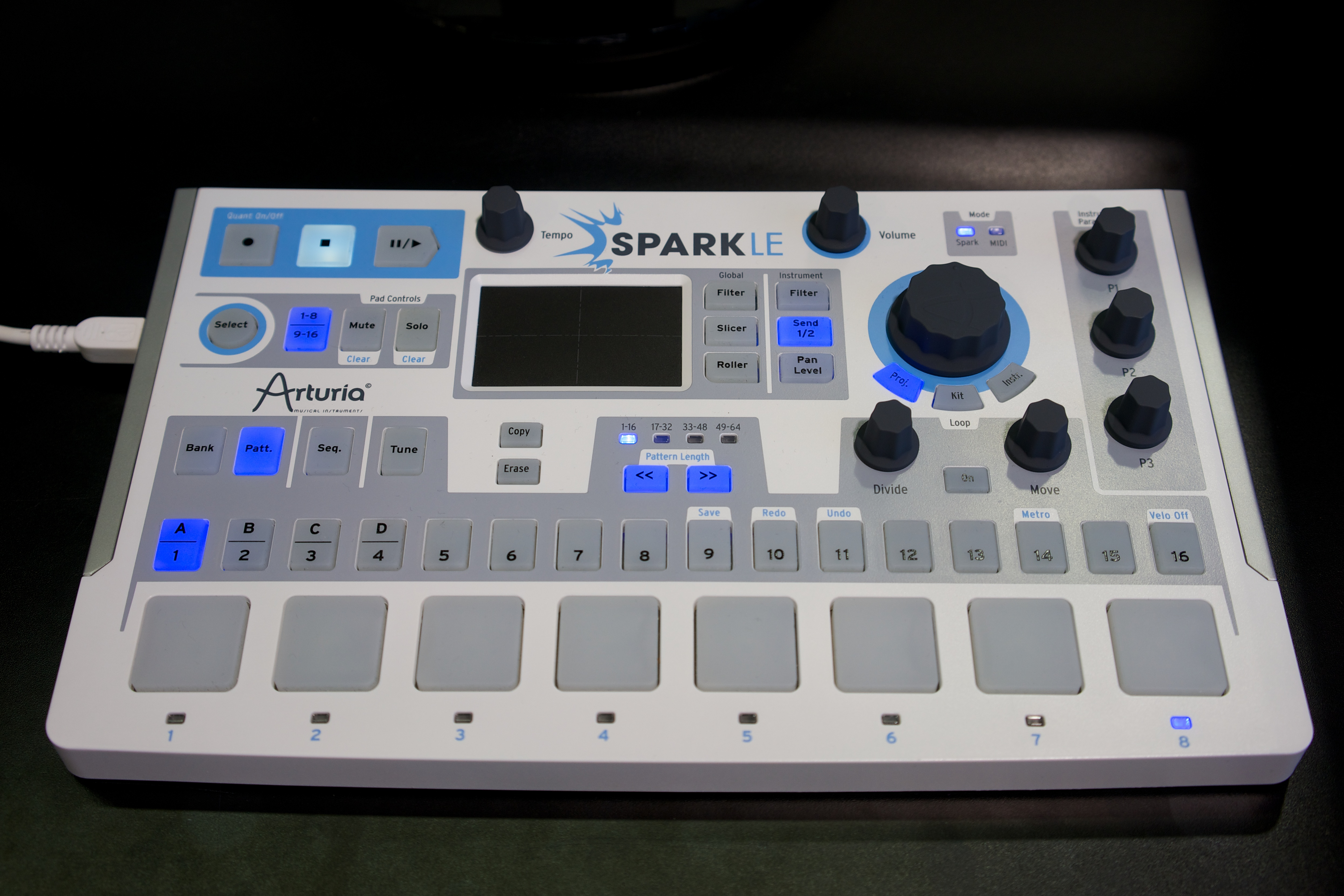
The Keystep's design was likened to that of the Arturia Spark (pictured).

Arturia announced the Keystep on 21 January 2016 at the NAMM Show. On its release, the journalist Robin Vincent remarked that the Keystep "has the look of the Arturia Spark about it."

The Keystep was received well by music technology critics. Si Truss of MusicRadar gave it a 4.5/5 star review, saying that "the KeyStep is easy to recommend." The Keystep appeared in Engadget's "IRL" column, in which Engadget's Senior Editor Roberto Baldwin said, "I don't want to be looking down while playing a show, I want to interact with the audience and the KeyStep allows that."

== Design ==
The Keystep is a MIDI and CV/gate controller with 32 mini keys. The keyboard is velocity sensitive and has channel aftertouch. Pitch bend and modulation strips are present instead of wheels, and buttons allow the keyboard to be transposed four octaves bidirectionally. The Keystep includes an arpeggiator and step sequencer with up to 64 steps; the sequencer has been compared that of the Roland JX3P. The back panel has connections for USB, sync, DIN MIDI, CV/gate and sustain pedal. Dimensions for the Keystep are 50 centimetres (20 in) x 15 centimetres (5.9 in).

=== Limited editions ===
In July 2021, Arturia released a black-coloured limited edition run of their _Step range of controllers. This included versions of the Keystep controllers. The changes made to the controllers were purely cosmetic: only the controller's colours were changed.

== Controversy ==
On 22 November 2020, Behringer released a new keyboard controller named Swing. The controller was widely criticised for copying the design of the Keystep; according to Robin Vincent of Gearnews, "it’s identical down to every key, button, connection and even the dip switches on the back." Two days after the release, Arturia's CEO Frédéric Brun made a statement on Facebook, saying:

Of course we accept competition, and would absolutely understand that Behringer give their own interpretation of a small and smart controller that would also be a sequencer. Others do, we have no problem with that and see good for the customer, as well as for the industry, in fair competition. But this is not fair competition here.

In response, Behringer made a blog post on the Music Tribe forum, titled "Competition. The Facts." In the post, they defended their actions, comparing their actions to the practice of cloning famous guitars, such as the Fender Stratocaster and Gibson Les Paul. Behringer did acknowledge the criticism, saying:

It is our Purpose and Mission to empower Customers who don’t have deep pockets and provide them with the best possible equipment at fair prices. We do understand that we are a fierce competitor and at times controversial as we’re relentlessly push the envelope

== Later models ==
=== Keystep Pro ===
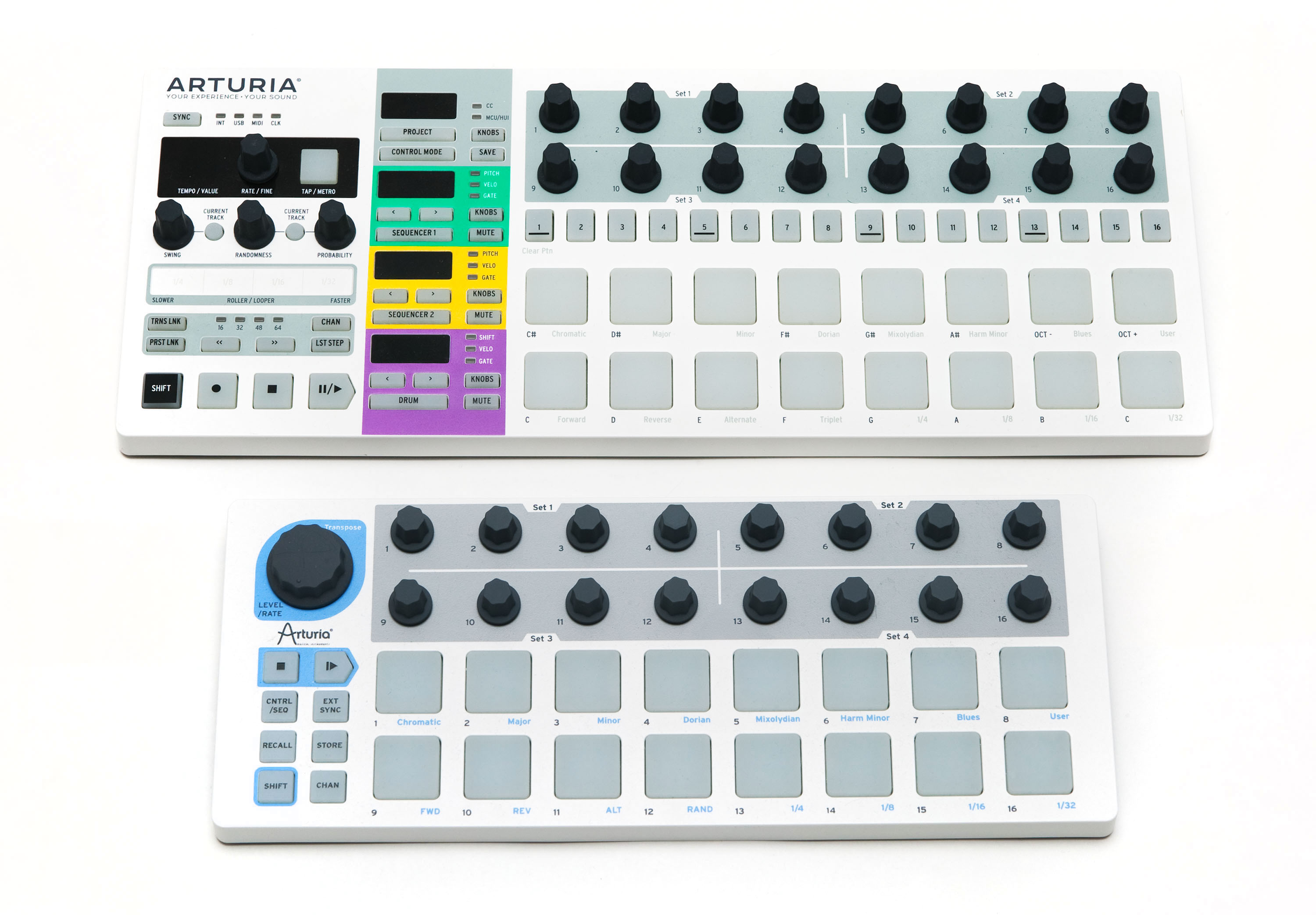
The Keystep Pro incorporates elements of Arturia's Beatstep series (pictured).

At the 2020 NAMM Show, Arturia announced the release of the Keystep Pro, an improved version of the Keystep with sequencing capabilities influenced by Arturia's Beatstep series. Critics gave the Keystep Pro high ratings: Terrence O'Brien of Engadget gave the keyboard a score of 86/100 and Si Truss of MusicRadar gave it 4.5/5 stars. The Pro has an increased keyboard size, with 37 keys, and has four sequencer tracks. It adds an OLED screen, an additional MIDI output, three more CV/gate outputs and a set of eight trigger outputs for drums. Keystep Pro has five encoders with the ability to send MIDI CCs. The keyboard is larger than the original Keystep, at 60 centimetres (24 in) x 20 centimetres (7.9 in).

The Keystep Pro received an update in 2021, adding global transpose and offset functions. Update 2.0 made improvements to tap tempo and the arpeggiator, as well as various other tweaks and bug fixes.

=== Keystep 37 ===
Arturia announced a third member of the Keystep series in September 2020: the Keystep 37. The Keystep 37 adds five more keys—bringing the total number to 37—and four assignable knobs. The controller also adds a LCD screen which displays tempo and MIDI CC values, and a scale quantisation mode.

The Keystep 37 has a chord mode with control over a "strum" parameter; the sounds produced by this function have been likened to those of the Suzuki Omnichord. The chord mode has 12 chord types available, and control over the number of notes in a chord, from two to sixteen.

== Awards ==
- 2016 Sonic Joy Award – Keystep
- NAMM 2020 Show Award – Keystep Pro
- Best of NAMM 2020 – Keystep Pro
- Rear of the gear of the year 2022 – Keystep 37
- 2022 SOS Award – Keystep 37
