= Steiner-Parker Synthacon =

Monophonic analog synthesizer

Synthacon
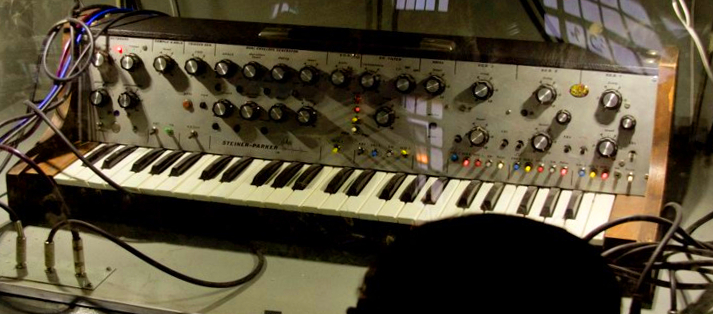
- Steiner-Parker Synthacon
- Manufacturer: Steiner-Parker
- Dates: 1975–1979

Technical specifications
- Polyphony: monophonic
- Timbrality: monotimbral
- Oscillator: 3 VCO
- Synthesis type: analog subtractive
- Filter: 2-pole resonant low-pass high-pass band-pass
- Attenuator: 2 ADSR envelope generators
- Effects: sample and hold, portamento

Input/output
- Keyboard: 49 keys
- External control: CV/Gate

The Steiner-Parker Synthacon is a monophonic analog synthesizer that was built between 1975 and 1979 by Steiner-Parker, a Salt Lake City-based synthesizer manufacturer. It was introduced as a competitor to other analog synthesizers, like the Minimoog and ARP Odyssey.

The Synthacon includes three voltage-controlled oscillators, a two-pole resonant Sallen Key filter, two attack, decay, sustain and release envelope generators, a pink and white noise generator, and a 49-key keyboard. While the Synthacon was not a modular system, signal routing could be achieved through a series of switches. Although Steiner-Parker only sold a few hundred units, the filter of the Synthacon is still in use in modern modular synthesizers and Arturia's Minibrute and Polybrute series of analog keyboard synthesizers.

== Development ==
The Synthacon was first released in 1975 as a more affordable competitor to the Minimoog and ARP Odyssey. It uses the same circuitry as Steiner-Parker's modular synthesizer of the same period, the SynthaSystem. The Synthacon's filter was designed by company co-founder Nyle Steiner.

== Synthesis model ==
The Synthacon is a monophonic analog synthesizer. It uses three voltage-controlled oscillators (VCOs) as sound sources. One oscillator could generate sine or sawtooth waves, and the other two could each generate either sawtooth, pulse, or triangle waves. The synthesizer was also capable of generating white and pink noise. Unlike those on the Minimoog, the oscillator controls on the Synthacon were placed on the right side of the sloped control panel; the Minimoog placed them on the left side.

The filter for the Synthacon, designed by Nyle Steiner, is a 12db/octave multimode filter capable of functioning as a resonant low-pass filter, a high-pass filter, or a band-pass filter. Like the contemporary Minimoog filter, the Steiner-Parker filter is capable of self-oscillation. Because the filter uses positive feedback, increasing the resonance does not cause the audio output to lose amplitude, as it does in the Minimoog and other analog synthesizers.

Several types of modulation are available on the Synthacon. Each oscillator can be modulated against the second attack, decay, sustain and release (ADSR) envelope, another VCO, the keyboard, the noise generator, or the sample-and-hold effect. The voltage controlled filter (VCF) can also be modulated by the second ADSR envelope, the keyboard, one of the VCOs, or the sample-and-hold. The VCA is modulated by the first ADSR envelope.

== Sales ==
According to designer Nyle Steiner, "several hundred Synthacons were made and sold". The Synthacon is considered to be relatively rare.

== Legacy ==
The Synthacon's filter circuit, often referred to as a Steiner-Parker filter, can be found in contemporary modular synthesizer designs due to its low cost and relative ease of construction.

The Arturia MiniBrute uses a 12db/octave multimode filter, designed by Yves Usson under guidance from Nyle Steiner, based on the Steiner-Parker Synthacon filter. The filter for the MiniBrute incorporates improvements on the circuit design to reduce the “chaotic behaviour“ (as Yves named it) of the original design. Usson insisted on the Steiner-Parker filter because of its versatility and its distinctive sound, which separates it from the 24db/octave filter used for synthesizers such as the Minimoog.

== See also ==
- Swede Patch 2000 — a synthesizer/guitar hybrid for which Steiner-Parker developed the Microcon, a smaller version of the Synthacon, around 1977
