= Cloud (music) =

Group of microsounds

In music, a cloud is a sound mass consisting of statistical clouds of hundreds or thousands of microsounds and characterized first by the set of elements used in the texture, secondly density, the number of events within a time period. Clouds may include ambiguity of rhythmic foreground and background or rhythmic hierarchy.

Examples include:

- Iannis Xenakis's Concret PH (1958), Bohor I (1962), Persepolis (1971), and many of his pieces for traditional instruments
- György Ligeti's Clocks and Clouds (1972–3)
- La Monte Young's The Well Tuned Piano
- Bernard Parmegiani's De natura sonorum (1975)

Clouds are created and used often in granular synthesis. Musical clouds exist on the "meso" or formal time scale. Clouds allow for the interpenetration of sound masses first described by Edgard Varèse including smooth mutation (through crossfade), disintegration, and coalescence.

Curtis Roads suggests a taxonomy of cloud morphology based on atmospheric clouds: cumulus, stratocumulus, stratus, nimbostratus, and cirrus; as well as nebulae: dark or glowing, amorphus or ring-shaped, and constantly evolving.

== Sources ==
=== Notations ===
- Roads, Curtis (2001). Microsound. Cambridge: MIT Press. ISBN 0-262-18215-7.
