= Curtis Roads =

American composer (born 1951)

Curtis Roads (born May 9, 1951) is an American composer, author, and computer programmer. He composes electronic and electroacoustic music, specializing in granular and pulsar synthesis.

== Career and music ==
Born in Cleveland, Ohio, Roads studied composition at the California Institute of the Arts, the University of California, San Diego, and Paris 8 University. He is the former chair and vice chair of the Media Arts and Technology Program and former associate director of the Center for Research in Electronic Art Technology at the University of California, Santa Barbara. He had previously taught at the University of Naples Federico II, Harvard University, Oberlin Conservatory of Music, Les Ateliers UPIC, and Paris 8 University.

He co-founded the International Computer Music Association in 1980 and edited the Computer Music Journal from 1978 to 2000. He has created software including PulsarGenerator and the Creatovox, both with Alberto de Campo.

Since 2004, he has been researching a new method of sound analysis called atomic decompositions, sponsored by the National Science Foundation.

The first movement of his composition Clang-Tint, "Purity", uses intervals from the Bohlen–Pierce scale.

== Publications ==
- Roads, Curtis (2015). Composing Electronic Music. Oxford University Press.
- Roads, Curtis (2001). Microsound. Cambridge: MIT Press. ISBN 0-262-18215-7
- Roads, Curtis (1996). The Computer Music Tutorial. MIT Press. ISBN 0-262-68082-3
- Roads, Curtis, Pope, Stephen Travis, Piccialli, Aldo and De Poli, Giovanni, eds (1997). Musical Signal Processing. Routledge. ISBN 90-265-1483-2
- Roads, Curtis and Strawn, John, eds (1987). Foundations of Computer Music. MIT Press. ISBN 0-262-68051-3

== Compositions ==
- POINT LINE CLOUD (2005) @Asphodel (Excerpt @ youtube)
- Half-life (1998–1999)
- Clang-Tint (1991–1994)
- nscor (1980)
