= Arturia =

French electronics company

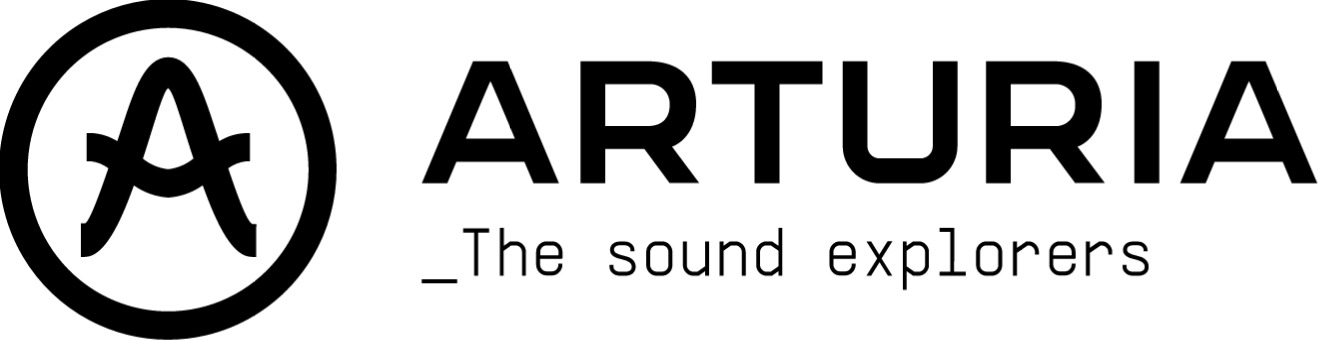
- Type: Privately Held Corporation
- Industry: Software and hardware for musical performance and production
- Founded: 1999 in Grenoble
- Founders: Frédéric Brun, Gilles Pommereuil
- Headquarters: Grenoble
- Products: Software synthesizers; Hardware synthesizers (analogue and digital); Midi keyboards; Controllers; Audio interfaces
- Number of employees: 100-199
- Website: arturia.com

Arturia is a French electronics company founded in 1999 and based in Grenoble, France. The company designs and manufactures audio interfaces and electronic musical instruments, including software synthesizers, drum machines, analog synthesizers, digital synthesizers, MIDI controllers, sequencers, and mobile apps.

== History ==
Arturia was founded in 1999 in Grenoble by INPG engineers Frédéric Brun and Gilles Pommereuil to create affordable software synthesizers. Unveiled in 2000, their first product was Storm, a virtual instrument workstation. The close emulation of classic analog synthesizers helped the company gain popularity in its market. Brun and Pommereuil developed new software algorithms that create sounds with minimal digital artifacts.

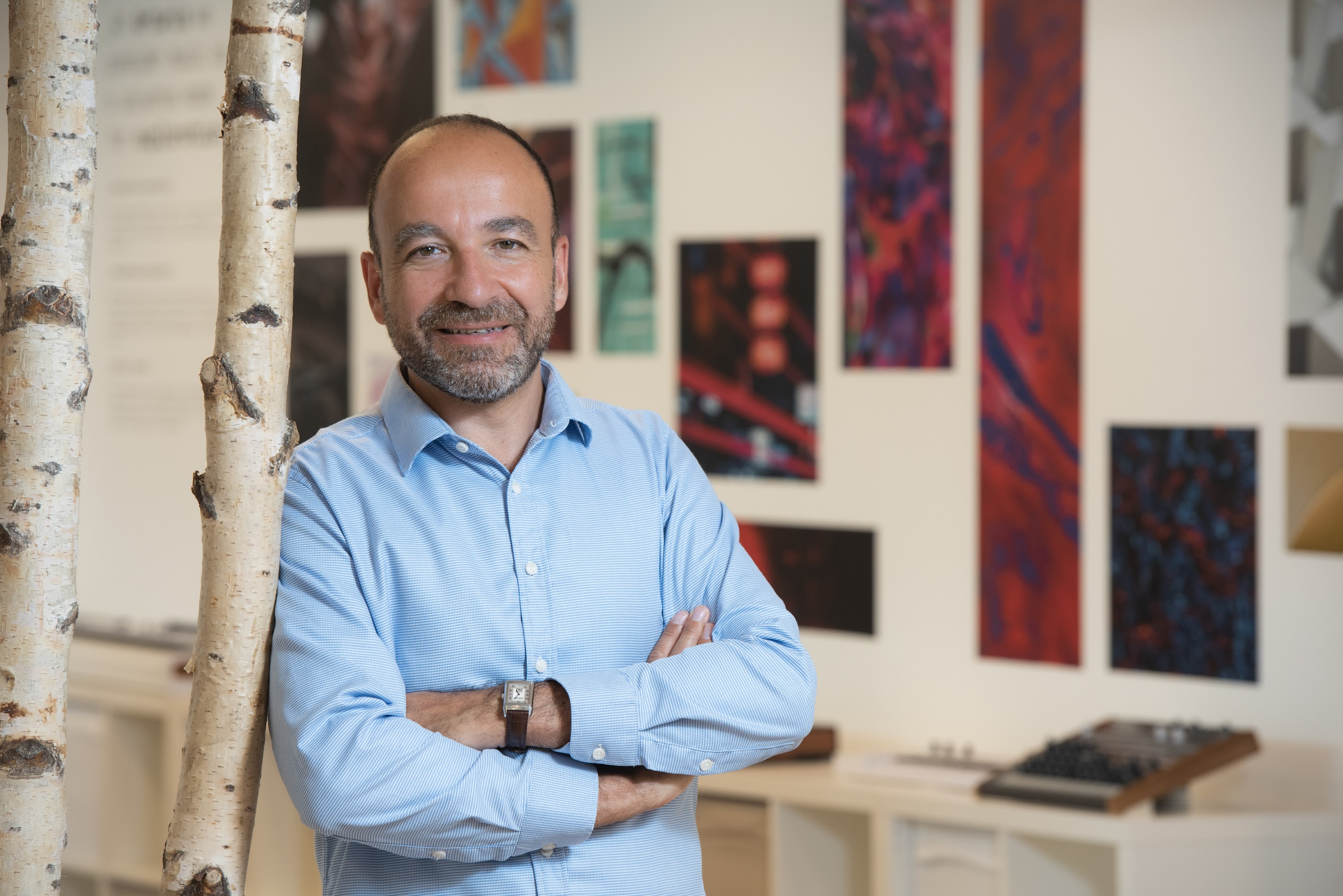
Frédéric Brun, founder and president of French musical instrument and software manufacturer Arturia.

Arturia worked with Robert Moog in 2003 to create the Modular V softsynth, which uses Arturia's True Analog Emulation (TAE) to faithfully reproduce the oscillators, filters, and other modules from the Moog 3C and Moog 55. Following these releases, Arturia developed software emulations of well-known synthesizers, including the ARP 2600, Roland Jupiter-8, Minimoog, and Sequential Circuits Prophet-5. Arturia continues to develop software synthesizers and effects, bundled respectively in the V Collection and FX Collection, which are updated every year.

In 2007, Arturia combined sounds from several of their softsynth titles into Analog Factory, which offered about 2000 preset synthesizer patches, offering this the following year as Analog Experience, a hybrid system which combined the software with a MIDI keyboard controller specifically designed to play and control it.

In 2009, Arturia released their first hardware synth, the Origin, a standalone, DSP-based system utilizing the same software engine as their virtual synth products. This was followed up in 2012 with the MiniBrute, a vintage-style 25-key monophonic analog synthesizer with one voltage-controlled oscillator, two low-frequency oscillators, and a multi-mode Steiner-Parker filter. Despite pre-production uncertainty about sales, the MiniBrute sold well due to its low price point and expressive sound. The following year, Arturia announced the MicroBrute, a smaller and less expensive version of the MiniBrute with minikeys, a patch bank, and a sequencer. Both synthesizers received critical acclaim.

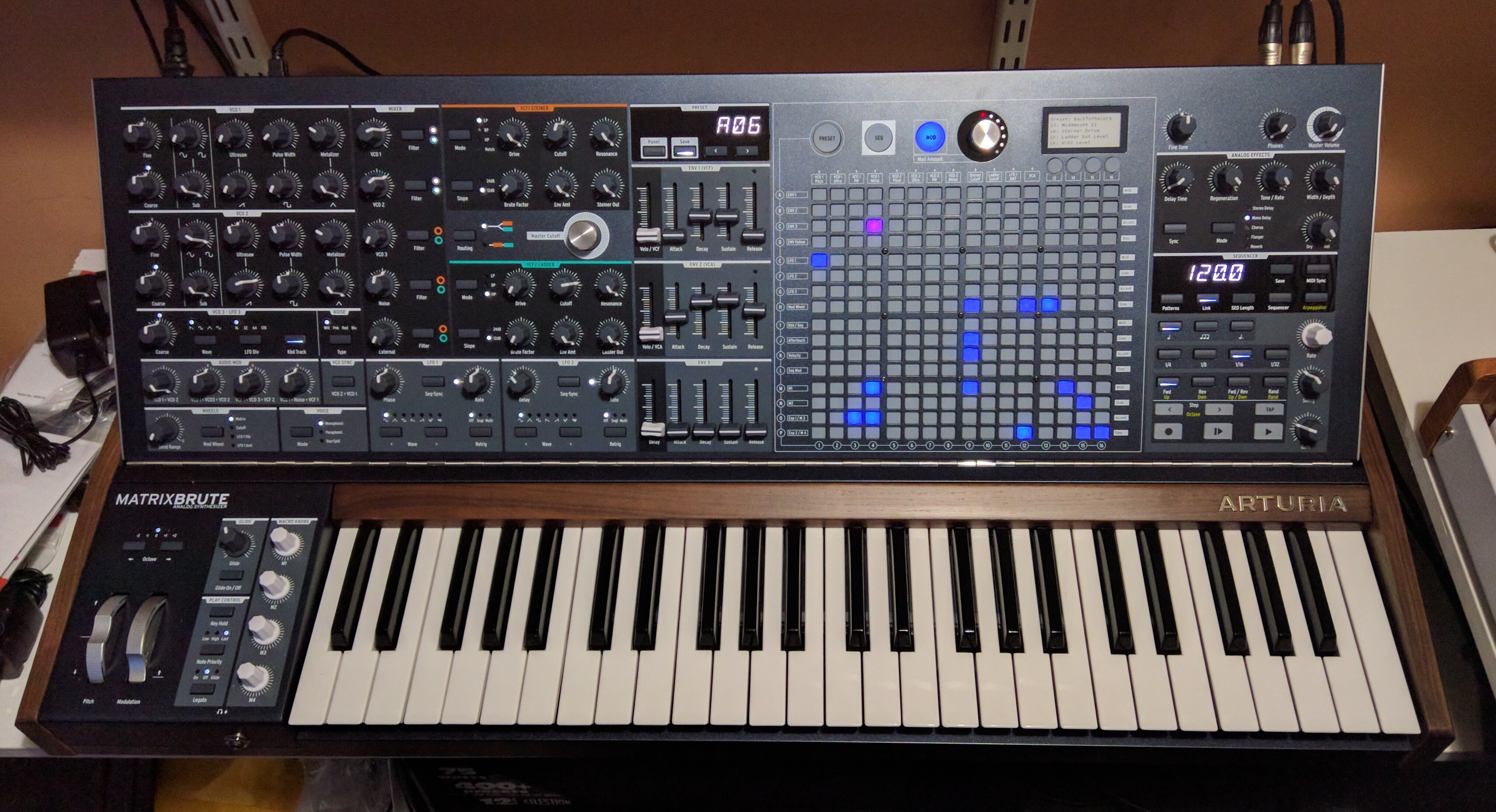
Arturia MatrixBrute (2016)

In 2015, Arturia launched the AudioFuse, a compact 2-input audio interface with dense connectivity. This was the start of a new line of products which now includes bigger-scale audio interfaces such as the AudioFuse studio, the AudioFuse 8pre and the updated version of the AudioFuse. In 2021, Arturia announced a more affordable line of audio interfaces called MiniFuse, with different number of inputs and colour formats.

In 2016, Arturia released the KeyStep, an entry-level 32-note keyboard focusing on sequencing and connectivity. Arturia added to this line with the KeyStep Pro, the BeatStep Pro and the KeyStep 37.

Released in 2016 as a part of the Brute family, the Drum Brute is an analog drum machine with a dedicated sequencer and 17 drum engines. Two years later Arturia released the DrumBrute Impact, a smaller and reworked version of the DrumBrute with the ability to add accent to sounds which changes the timbre of each drum engine.

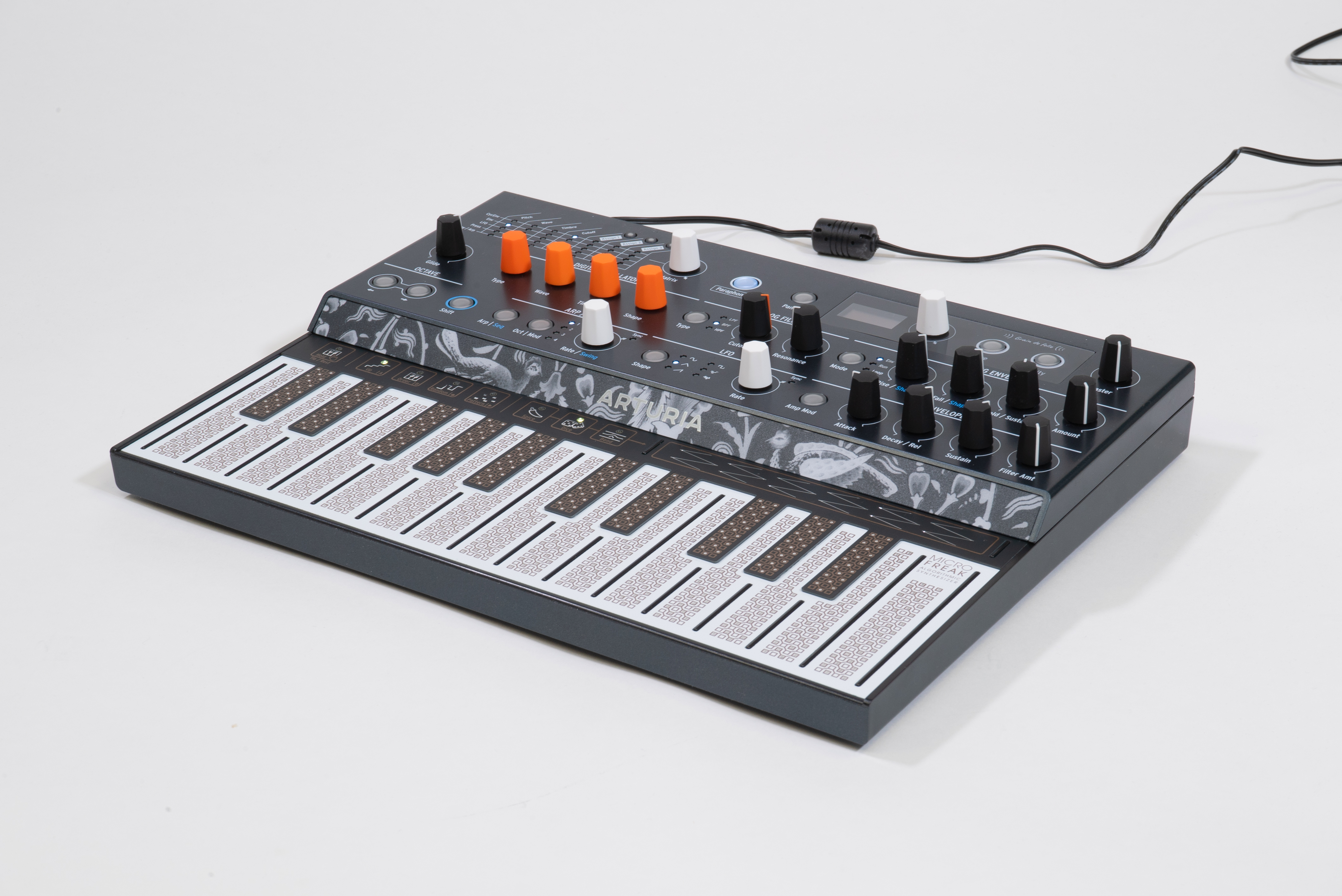
Arturia MicroFreak (2019)

In 2018, they introduced MiniBrute 2, a semi-modular analog synth that includes a patch bay that connects to Eurorack modular gear. They also introduced the MiniBrute 2S which swaps a traditional keyboard for performance pads and a sequencer that can be recorded in real time.

In 2019, Arturia released the MicroFreak, a 4-voice paraphonic hybrid synthesizer with digital oscillators, an analog filter and a distinctive touch capacitive keyboard. The digital oscillator allows for different algorithms to be loaded onto the unit, including algorithms by Mutable Instruments and Noise Engineering. Arturia followed up with the MiniFreak in 2022, which featured 6-voices of polyphony, more functionality and a larger traditional keyboard.

Arturia released the PolyBrute, its flagship 6-voice-polyphonic analog synthesiser in 2021. Its layout is reminiscent of its monophonic counterpart, the MatrixBrute, and shares a similar voice architecture to other analog synthesisers from Arturia's Brute range. In addition it features a touchstrip over the keyboard and a multidimensional touchpad called “morphée” which allows more control over the sound. In May of 2024, Arturia released the PolyBrute 12.

In April 2024, Arturia introduced the AstroLab, a 61-key stage keyboard designed to bridge the gap between software instruments and live performance. Operating as a standalone unit, it comes pre-loaded with presets drawn directly from Arturia's V Collection, Pigments, and Analog Lab. Arturia expanded the AstroLab range in 2025 with two additional models. The AstroLab 88 was introduced for players requiring a full-sized, 88-key hammer-action keyboard, followed by the AstroLab 37 later that year, which retains the same internal processing power and sound engines in a smaller 37-key format.

== Products ==
The company's product line includes software synthesizers, software bundles, hardware synthesizers, MIDI keyboards and sequencers, mobile apps, and other audio equipment and controllers.

Arturia sells software instruments and software FX processors as individual items and also as part of the "V" synth collection or the "FX" collection.

Arturia's first instruments were emulations of historical synthesizers, organs, and pianos. Arturia's Analog Lab is a collection of presets of these synths with limited sound modeling available, and comes bundled with many of their Keyboard Midi controllers. In 2018 Arturia released their first original software synthesizer named Pigments. Pigments now features six synthesis types, extensive modulation sources and visual indication of control signals. In 2022 Arturia released a new line of "Augmented" software instruments, which brought new approaches to already known sounds.

Arturia's first software FX processors were emulations of historical processors, such as preamps and filters. Arturia has since developed original FX processors, such as Rev INTENSITY, Buss FORCE, Efx FRAGMENTS (granular delay), and Dist COLDFIRE.

When Arturia emulates a historical instrument or FX processor, they generally add new functionality such as additional modulation possibilities.
