= Arturia MiniBrute =

Synthesizer

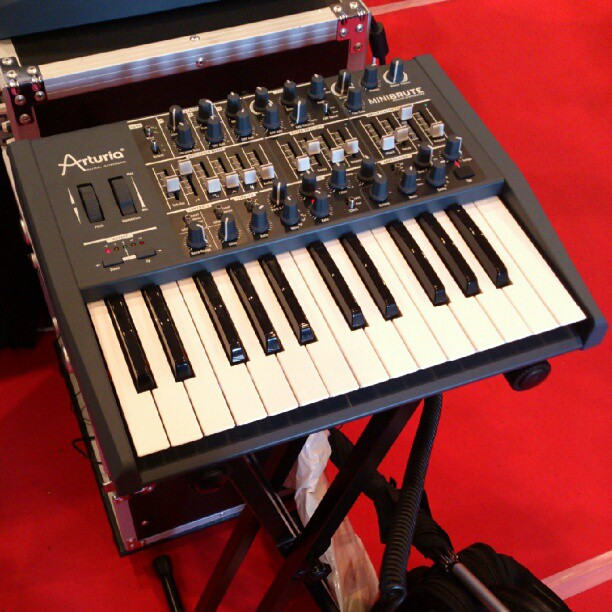
- Manufacturer: Arturia
- Dates: 2012–2016 (Minibrute) 2016-present (Minibrute2/2s)
- Price: US$499; €499; £348

Technical specifications
- Polyphony: monophonic
- Timbrality: monotimbral
- Oscillator: 1 VCO
- LFO: 2
- Synthesis type: analog subtractive
- Filter: 12 dB/octave resonant low-pass resonant high-pass band-pass notch
- Attenuator: 2 ADSR envelope generators (VCA and VCF)
- Aftertouch expression: yes
- Velocity expression: yes
- Effects: Brute Factor (drive)

Input/output
- Keyboard: 25 keys
- Left-hand control: Pitch bend and mod wheels
- External control: MIDI IN/OUT, USB MIDI, CV/Gate

The Arturia MiniBrute is a synthesizer manufactured by Arturia. Although the MiniBrute was the first piece of analog hardware created by Arturia—which had previously exclusively marketed software synthesizers—it generated strong sales.

The MiniBrute takes some cues from vintage monophonic synthesizers, such as the Roland SH-101 and Minimoog. However, it also incorporates modern technology to increase its versatility, stability and depth of sound. The synthesizer uses a single, highly shapeable oscillator, which can be processed through a multimode Steiner-Parker filter and multiple LFOs.

== Background ==
Before releasing the MiniBrute, Arturia was known for its affordable software synthesizers. These were generally faithful software emulations of classic analog synthesizers, such as the Moog 3C and Moog 55. The MiniBrute was the first piece of analog hardware manufactured by Arturia. Following the 2010 NAMM Show, Arturia CEO Frédéric Brun began to receive word that American customers were interested in small, low-cost analog synthesizers, which were not available at the time (British synthesizer-manufacturer, Novation had long stopped production of its small Bass Station synthesizers). In June 2010, Arturia reached out to synthesizer designer Yves Usson of YuSynth in order to gain insight into the production of analog hardware. Usson designed schematics for the circuitry of the MiniBrute and helped troubleshoot technical problems. The release of the MiniBrute was first announced at the 2012 NAMM Show.

There was some uncertainty about whether or not a monophonic synthesizer would sell well compared to contemporary digital and analog competitors, which were mostly polyphonic. New analog monosynths were not common at the time. Despite this, Arturia invested resources in the unit's build quality and produced a fairly large first run.

== Design influences ==
The MiniBrute uses a single oscillator, which is reminiscent of synthesizers such as the ARP Axxe of the 1970s or Roland SH-101 of the 1980s. Also like the SH-101, the MiniBrute gives the option to mix pure analog waveforms to generate unique shapes. However, at the insistence of hardware designer Yves Usson, Arturia chose to depart somewhat from these vintage synthesizers by using a modern modification of a 12 dB/octave Steiner-Parker multimode filter—like those found in rare Steiner-Parker Synthacons—rather than emulating those used in more popular machines, which were often 24 dB/octave to produce a "beefier" effect. The MiniBrute's filter also eliminates the technical limitations of more common filters, which tend to have a single mode. Usson had also considered emulating the Korg MS-20 filter and various others, but ultimately elected to use a filter that was not already widely available in other machines.

Usson is known for his DIY work with synthesizers, especially modular synthesizers. This is reflected in some design elements of the MiniBrute. For example, the MiniBrute includes an effect called Brute Factor, which is a form of overdrive. It is inspired by the technique of rerouting the voltage-controlled amplifier (VCA) output on a Moog Minimoog to be processed through the synthesizer again. However, like the similar concept employed by Dave Smith Instruments Mopho synthesizer series from 2008, Brute Factor does not require any patching, as it is built into the MiniBrute. Unlike the DSI Mopho, however, the MiniBrute's 'Brute Factor' circuitry is permanently available, not broken by the connection of an actual external input. Additionally, Usson has made technical diagrams for the MiniBrute's circuitry available on his website, HackABrute, to encourage users to modify their machines. He has also included proposed modifications that have been tested. However, making modifications to the internal system, including those listed on the site, voids Arturia's product warranty.

== Synthesis model ==
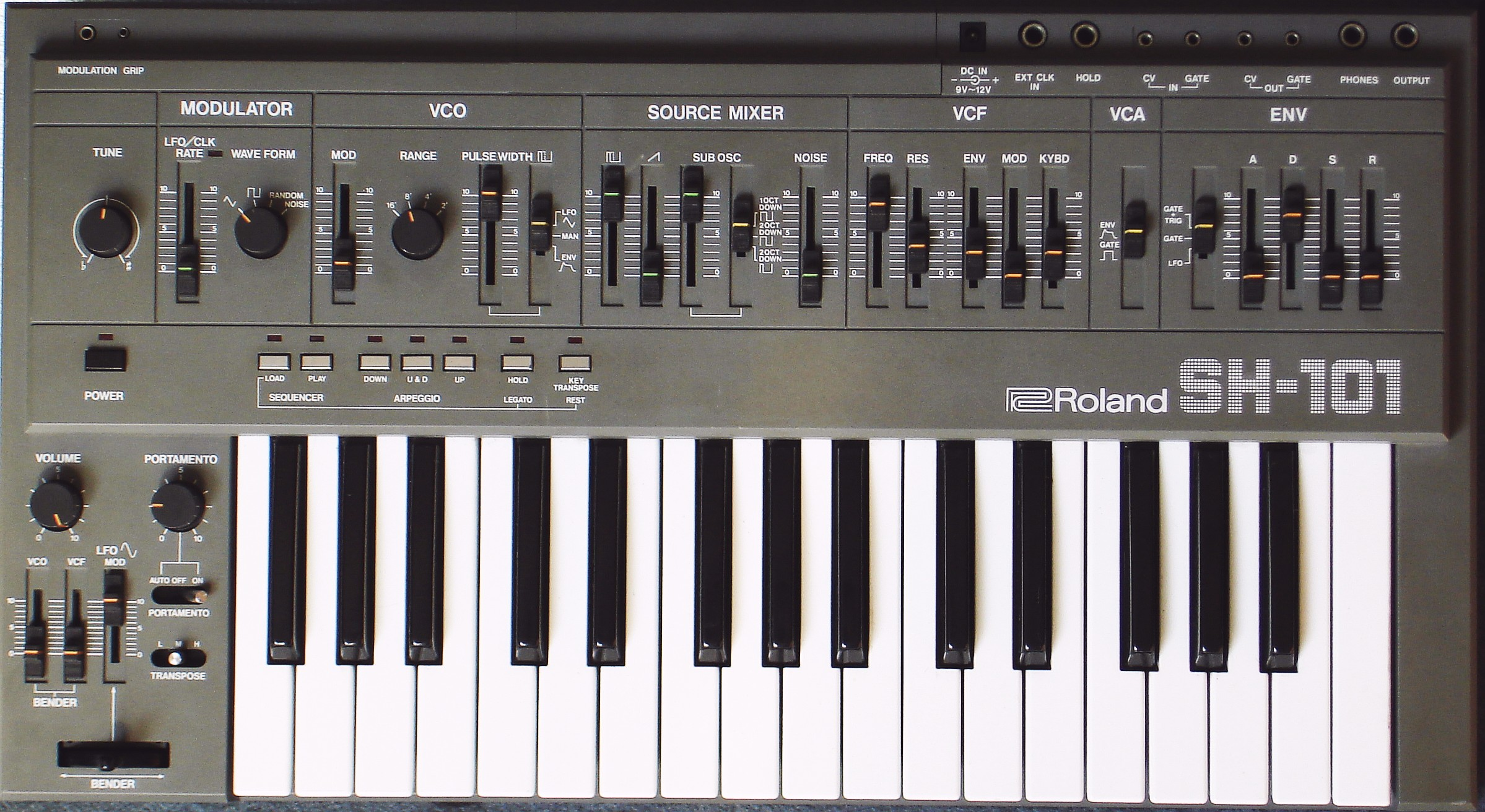
The ability to mix wave shapes on a single oscillator recalls the Roland SH-101.

The MiniBrute's single oscillator can be set to sawtooth, pulse (modulatable width), triangle, white noise, or any combination of these. The three waveforms each have options for additional wave shaping. Although pulse-width modulation is common for analog synthesizers, the shaping options for the sawtooth and triangle are unique to the MiniBrute. The MiniBrute also includes a sub-oscillator and external signal processing.

The oscillator is processed through a multimode 12 dB/octave Steiner-Parker filter. The user can select a low-pass filter, high-pass filter, band-pass filter, or notch filter. Although this filter made the MiniBrute more versatile than its vintage predecessors, Gordon Reid of Sound on Sound was critical of the choice not to emulate a more popular Moog filter. The filter has its own dedicated ADSR envelope generator and can also be modulated by LFO or the modulation wheel. The filter was designed by Usson.

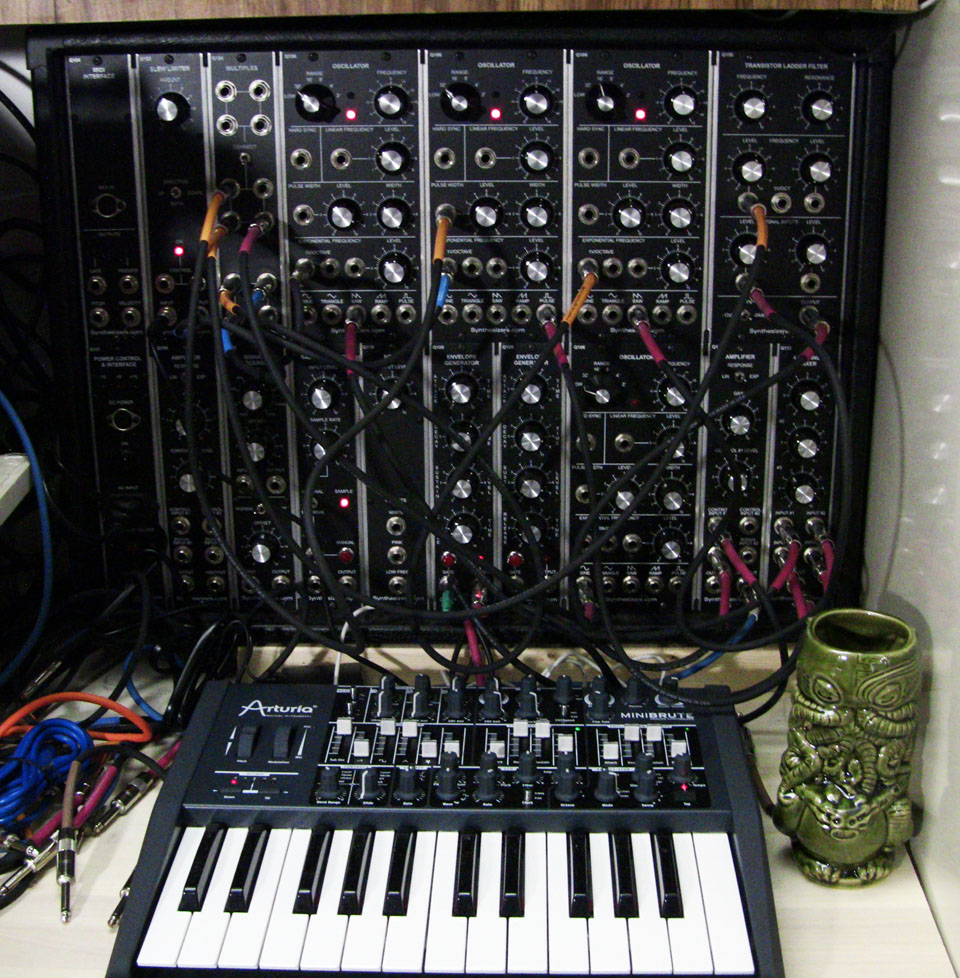
The MiniBrute shown in front of a Moog Modular System

The MiniBrute's LFO can be routed to wave shape modulation, filter cutoff, pitch, and amplitude. Various wave shapes are available for the LFO. It can also be synced to the MiniBrute's arpeggiator. The audio output can be reprocessed through the synthesizer using the Brute Factor to achieve an overdrive effect.

== Impact ==
The MiniBrute reintroduced the analog monophonic format for newly produced synthesizers. Although its release posed a risk for Arturia in an uncertain market, the units sold well due to their low price point and relatively high quality. Prior to the release of the MiniBrute, analog synthesizers tended to retail for US$1,000 or more; the MiniBrute entered the market at around US$500, making it more accessible to new users. Nick Batt of Sonic State called the MiniBrute "one of the first of this...new breed of nouveau analog", citing the Korg MS-20 Mini, Korg Volca series, and Novation Bass Station II as others following the trend.

Arturia later issued an updated edition of the MiniBrute, the MiniBrute SE, which used an updated design and included a step sequencer.

=== MicroBrute ===
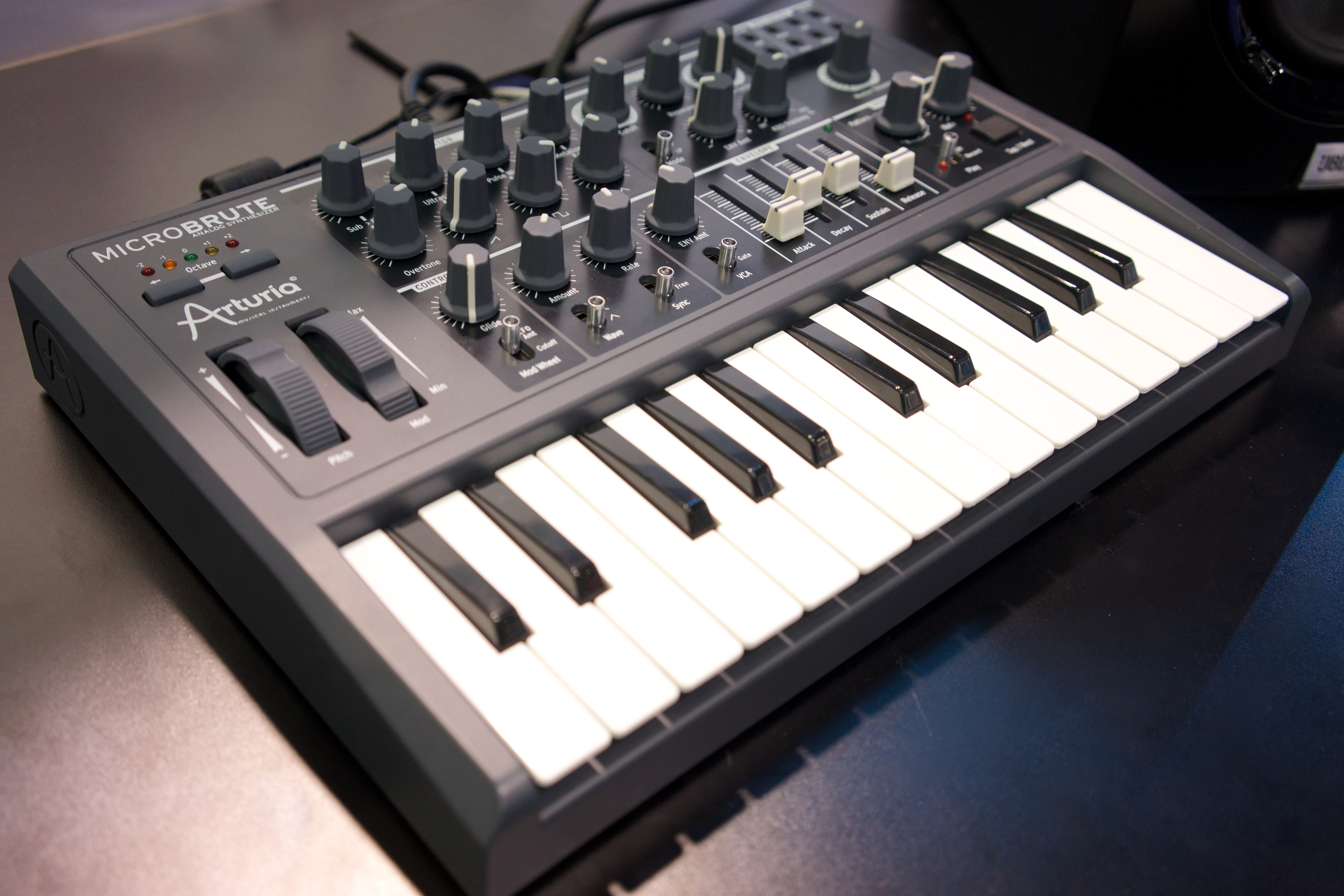
Original MicroBrute

Following the success of the MiniBrute, Arturia released the MicroBrute, a smaller analog monosynth, in 2014. The MicroBrute lacks the MiniBrute's velocity and aftertouch and does use a single-knob-per-function model, but adds an analog step sequencer and a small patch bay. Arturia later released an updated edition of the MicroBrute, the MicroBrute SE, which featured an updated Sub-Oscillator and step sequencer design.

=== MiniBrute 2 and 2s ===
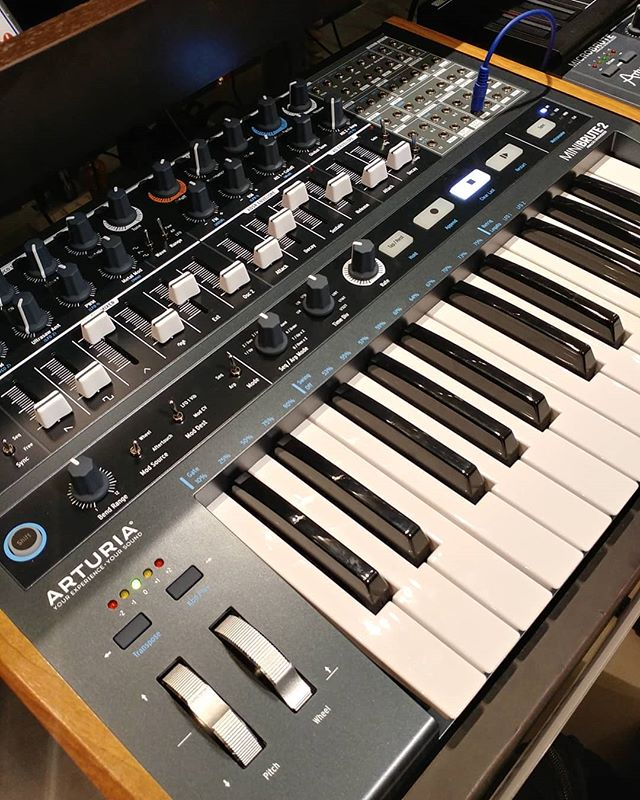
Close up picture of the Minibrute 2

In 2016, Arturia released an updated version of the MiniBrute. It features two oscillators, an extensive 48-point patchbay, and more modulation capabilities. This synthesizer was released in two formats: one with a 2-octave keyboard, and a smaller version with a 16-pad multichannel sequencer instead called the Minibrute 2s.

=== MatrixBrute ===
At the 2016 winter NAMM show, Arturia announced the MatrixBrute, a 3 VCO analog synthesizer based on the MiniBrute. The MatrixBrute includes a Moog-style ladder filter in addition to the Steiner-Parker filter found on the MiniBrute and MicroBrute. Unlike its predecessors, the MatrixBrute is modular; however, it uses a matrix of backlit buttons to represent patches instead of cables.
