= Granular synthesis =

Sound synthesis method involving samples shorter than 0.1 seconds

Granular synthesis is a sound synthesis method that operates on the microsound time scale.

Excerpt from Agon – Horacio Vaggione
A piece of music composed with fast and slow granular synthesis.

It is based on the same principle as sampling. However, the samples are split into small pieces of around 1 to 100 ms in duration, called grains. Multiple grains may be layered on top of each other, and may play at different speeds, phases, volume, and frequency, among other parameters.

At low speeds of playback, the result is a kind of soundscape, often described as a cloud, that is manipulated in a manner unlike that of natural sound sampling or other synthesis techniques. At high speeds, the result is heard as a note or notes of a novel timbre. By varying the waveform, envelope, duration, spatial position, and density of the grains, many different sounds can be produced.

Fast granular synthesis demonstration
An example of granular synthesis. Note how the tiny snippets of sound (the grains) are initially distinct, but then blend together, generating a completely new timbre.

Both have been used for musical purposes: as sound effects, raw material for further processing by other synthesis or digital signal processing effects, or as complete musical works in their own right. Conventional effects that can be achieved include amplitude modulation and time stretching. More experimentally, stereo or multichannel scattering, random reordering, disintegration and morphing are possible.

== History ==
In 1947, Dennis Gabor introduced the idea that sounds can be represented by a series of elementary "grains," each grain being a short pulse containing both temporal and frequency information. Greek-French composer Iannis Xenakis is known as the inventor of granular synthesis, having expanded upon Gabor's theoretical foundation.

The composer Iannis Xenakis (1960) was the first to explicate a compositional theory for grains of sound. He began by adopting the following lemma: "All sound, even continuous musical variation, is conceived as an assemblage of a large number of elementary sounds adequately disposed in time. In the attack, body, and decline of a complex sound, thousands of pure sounds appear in a more or less short interval of time $\Delta t$." Xenakis created granular sounds using analog tone generators and tape splicing. These appear in the composition Analogique A-B for string orchestra and tape (1959).

American composer Curtis Roads was the first to implement granular synthesis on a computer in 1974. In 1986, Canadian composer Barry Truax implemented real-time granular synthesis using the DMX-1000 Signal Processing Computer.

== Microsound ==
This includes all sounds on the time scale shorter than musical notes, the sound object time scale, and longer than the sample time scale. Specifically, this is shorter than one tenth of a second and longer than 10 milliseconds, which includes part of the audio frequency range (20 Hz to 20 kHz) as well as part of the infrasonic frequency range (below 20 Hz, rhythm).

These sounds include transient audio phenomena and are known in acoustics and signal processing by various names including sound particles, quantum acoustics, sonal atom, grain, glisson, grainlet, trainlet, microarc, wavelet, chirplet, fof, time-frequency atom, pulsar, impulse, toneburst, tone pip, acoustic pixel, and others. In the frequency domain they may be named kernel, logon, and frame, among others.

Micromontage is musical montage with microsound.

Microtime is the level of "sonic" or aural "syntax" or the "time-varying distribution of...spectral energy".

== Related software ==
- Csound – comprehensive music software including granular synthesis (overview of granular synthesis opcodes)
- Max/MSP – graphical authoring software for real-time audio and video
- Pure Data (Pd) – graphical programming language for real-time audio and video
- SuperCollider – programming language for real time audio synthesis
- ChucK - strongly-timed computer music programming language
- EmissionControl2 - granular sound synthesizer

== Related hardware ==
- Mutable Instruments Clouds – a digital, open source eurorack synthesizer module which has four factory set modes, the first and default being a granular processor.
- Make Noise Morphagene – a eurorack synthesizer module built around microsound, or granular synthesis, in addition to Musique Concrète-inspired sound on sound audio manipulation.
- Tasty Chips GR-1 - polyphonic granular synthesizer capable of 128 grains per voice, which can add up to a total of 1000+ grains simultaneously.
- Instruō Arbhar – a eurorack synthesizer module first launched in 2019 built around the 'Lexer Method' of granular synthesis, with onset detection for automatic sampling into any one of six 10 second audio buffers, mono/stereo configuration, up to 88 polyphonic grains, CV control of all granular parameters, plus user-defined configuration files.

== See also ==
- Digital signal processing
- Micromontage audio montage on the time scale of microsounds
- Texture synthesis, analogous process for images

== Bibliography ==
=== Articles ===
- "Granular Synthesis" by Eric Kuehnl
- "The development of GiST, a Granular. Synthesis Toolkit Based on an Extension of the FOF Generator" by Gerhard Eckel and Manuel Rocha Iturbide
- Searching for a global synthesis technique through a quantum conception of sound by Manuel Rocha Iturbide
- Further articles on Granular Synthesis
- Bencina, R. (2006) "Implementing Real-Time Granular Synthesis", in Greenbaum & Barzel (eds.), Audio Anecdotes III, ISBN 1-56881-215-9, A.K. Peters, Natick. online pdf

=== Books ===
- Miranda, E. R. (2002). Computer Sound Design: Synthesis Techniques and Programming. Oxford: Focal Press. ISBN 0-240-51693-1.
- Roads, Curtis (2001). Microsound. Cambridge: MIT Press. ISBN 0-262-18215-7.
- Wilson, Scott (2011). The SuperCollider Book. Cambridge: The MIT Press. ISBN 978-0-262-23269-2.
- Iturbide, Manuel Rocha (1999). "Doctoral Thesis: Les techniques granulaires dans la synthèse sonore". ArteSonoro.net. University of Paris VIII.

== Discography ==
- Curtis Roads (2004). CD with Microsounds. MIT Press. ISBN 0-262-18215-7. Contains excerpts of nscor and Field (1981). Microsounds at Discogs.
  - nscor (1980), New Computer Music (1987) Wergo 2010–50 at Discogs (list of releases)
- Iannis Xenakis. Analogique A-B (1959), on Alpha & Omega at Discogs and Music For Strings at Discogs
- Truax, Barry (1987). Digital Soundscapes Digital Soundscapes at Discogs
