= Music technology (electronic and digital) =

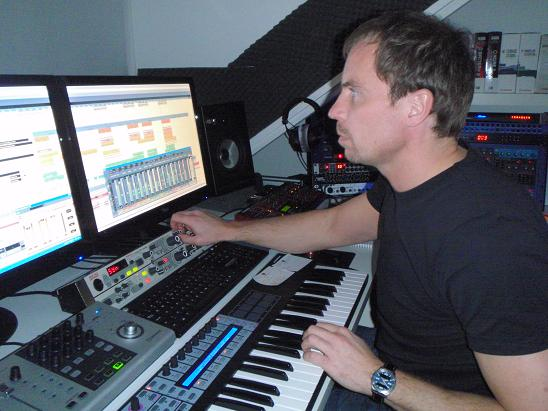
Music production using a digital audio workstation (DAW) with multi-monitor set-up

Digital music technology encompasses the use of digital instruments to produce, perform or record music. These instruments vary, including computers, electronic effects units, software, and digital audio equipment. Digital music technology is used in performance, playback, recording, composition, mixing, analysis and editing of music, by professions in all parts of the music industry.

== History ==
In the late 19th century, Thaddeus Cahill introduced the Telharmonium, which is commonly considered the first electromechanical musical instrument. In the early 20th century, Leon Theremin created the Theremin, an early electronic instrument played without physical contact, creating a new form of sound creation.

In the mid-20th century, sampling emerged, with artists like Pierre Schaeffer and Karlheinz Stockhausen manipulating recorded sounds on tape to create entirely new compositions. This laid the foundation for future electronic music production techniques.

In the 1960s, the Moog synthesizer, invented by Robert Moog, popularized analog synthesis. Musician Wendy Carlos demonstrated Robert's invention with the album Switched-On Bach, which consisted of works composed by Johann Sebastian Bach interpreted with the Moog synthesizer. Meanwhile, tape-based studios, like the BBC Radiophonic Workshop, were at the forefront of electronic sound design.

The 1980s saw a major shift towards digital technology with the development of the Musical Instrument Digital Interface (MIDI) standard. This allowed electronic instruments to communicate with computers and each other, transforming music production. Digital synthesizers, such as the Yamaha DX7, became widely popular.

The 1990s and 2000s witnessed the explosive growth of electronic dance music and its various subgenres, driven by the accessibility of digital music production tools and the rise of computer-based software synthesizers.

== Education ==
=== Professional training ===
Courses in music technology are offered at many different universities as part of degree programs focusing on performance, composition, music research at the undergraduate and graduate level. The study of music technology is usually concerned with the creative use of technology for creating new sounds, performing, recording, programming sequencers or other music-related electronic devices, and manipulating, mixing and reproducing music. Music technology programs train students for careers in "...sound engineering, computer music, audio-visual production and post-production, mastering, scoring for film and multimedia, audio for games, software development, and multimedia production." Those wishing to develop new music technologies often train to become an audio engineer working in research and development. Due to the increasing role of interdisciplinary work in music technology, individuals developing new music technologies may also have backgrounds or training in electrical engineering, computer programming, computer hardware design, acoustics, record producing or other fields.

=== Use of music technology in education ===
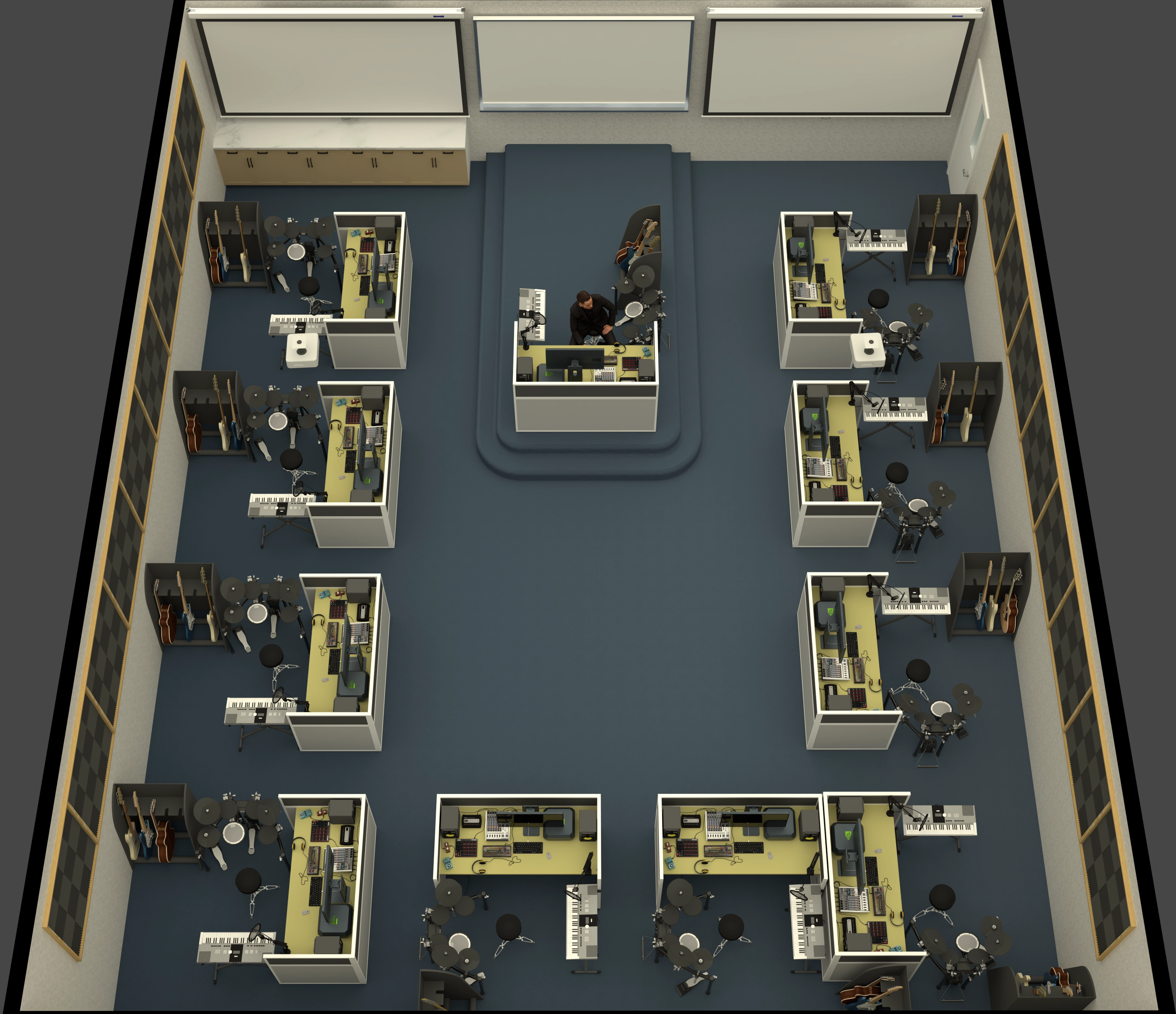
3D model of a digital audio workstation classroom

Digital music technologies are widely used to assist in music education for training students in the home, elementary school, middle school, high school, college and university music programs. Electronic keyboard labs are used for cost-effective beginner group piano instruction in high schools, colleges, and universities. Courses in music notation software and basic manipulation of audio and MIDI can be part of a student's core requirements for a music degree. Mobile and desktop applications are available to aid the study of music theory and ear training. Some digital pianos provide interactive lessons and games using the built-in features of the instrument to teach music fundamentals.

==== Analog Synthesizers ====
Classic analog synthesizers include the Moog Minimoog, ARP Odyssey, Yamaha CS-80, Korg MS-20, Sequential Circuits Prophet-5, Roland TB-303, Roland Alpha Juno. One of the most iconic synthesizers is the Roland TB-303, was widely used in acid house music.

=== Digital synthesizer history ===
Classic digital synthesizers include the Fairlight CMI, PPG Wave, Nord Modular and Korg M1.

=== Computer music history ===
==== Max Mathews ====
Computer and synthesizer technology joining together changed the way music is made and is one of the fastest-changing aspects of music technology today. Max Mathews, an acoustic researcher at Bell Telephone Laboratories' Acoustic and Behavioural Research Department, is responsible for some of the first digital music technology in the 1950s. Mathews also pioneered a cornerstone of music technology; analog-to-digital conversion.

At Bell Laboratories, Matthews conducted research to improve the telecommunications quality for long-distance phone calls. Owing to long-distance and low-bandwidth, audio quality over phone calls across the United States was poor. Thus, Matthews devised a method in which sound was synthesized via computer on the distant end rather than transmitted. Matthews was an amateur violinist, and during a conversation with his superior, John Pierce at Bell Labs, Pierce posed the idea of synthesizing music through a computer. Since Matthews had already synthesized speech, he agreed and wrote a series of programs known as MUSIC. MUSIC consisted of two files: an orchestra file containing data telling the computer how to synthesize sound, and a score file instructing the program what notes to play using the instruments defined in the orchestra file. Matthews wrote five iterations of MUSIC, calling them MUSIC I-V respectively. Subsequently, as the program was adapted and expanded to run on various platforms, its name changed to reflect its new changes. This series of programs became known as the MUSIC-N paradigm. The concept of the MUSIC now exists in the form of Csound.

Later Max Matthews worked as an advisor to IRCAM in the late 1980s. There, he taught Miller Puckette, a researcher. Puckette developed a program in which music could be programmed graphically. The program could transmit and receive MIDI messages to generate interactive music in real-time. Inspired by Matthews, Puckette named the program Max. Later, a researcher named David Zicarelli visited IRCAM, saw the capabilities of Max and felt it could be developed further. He took a copy of Max with him when he left and eventually added capabilities to process audio signals. Zicarelli named this new part of the program MSP after Miller Puckette. Zicarelli developed the commercial version of MaxMSP and sold it at his company, Cycling '74, beginning in 1997. The company has since been acquired by Ableton.

==== Later history ====
The first generation of professional commercially available computer music instruments, or workstations as some companies later called them, were very sophisticated elaborate systems that cost a great deal of money when they first appeared. They ranged from $25,000 to $200,000. The two most popular were the Fairlight, and the Synclavier.

It was not until the advent of MIDI that general-purpose computers started to play a role in music production. Following the widespread adoption of MIDI, computer-based MIDI editors and sequencers were developed. MIDI-to-CV/Gate converters were then used to enable analog synthesizers to be controlled by a MIDI sequencer.

=== MIDI ===
At the NAMM Show of 1983 in Los Angeles, MIDI was released. A demonstration at the convention showed two previously incompatible analog synthesizers, the Prophet 600 and Roland Jupiter-6, communicating with each other, enabling a player to play one keyboard while getting the output from both of them. This development immediately allowed synths to be accurately layered in live shows and studio recordings. MIDI enables different electronic instruments and electronic music devices to communicate with each other and with computers. The advent of MIDI spurred a rapid expansion of the sales and production of electronic instruments and music software.

In 1985, several of the top keyboard manufacturers created the MIDI Manufacturers Association (MMA). This newly founded association standardized the MIDI protocol by generating and disseminating all the documents about it. With the development of the MIDI file format specification by Opcode, every music software company's MIDI sequencer software could read and write each other's files.

Since the 1980s, personal computers became the ideal system for utilizing the vast potential of MIDI. This has created a large consumer market for software such as MIDI-equipped electronic keyboards, MIDI sequencers and digital audio workstations. With universal MIDI protocols, electronic keyboards, sequencers, and drum machines can all be connected together.

=== Vocal synthesis history until 1980s ===
==== VODER ====
Coinciding with the history of computer music is the history of vocal synthesis. Prior to Max Matthews synthesizing speech with a computer, analog devices were used to recreate speech. In the 1930s, an engineer named Homer Dudley invented the Voice Operating Demonstrator (VODER), an electro-mechanical device which generated a sawtooth wave and white-noise. Various parts of the frequency spectrum of the waveforms could be filtered to generate the sounds of speech. Pitch was modulated via a bar on a wrist strap worn by the operator. In the 1940s Dudley, invented the Voice Operated Coder (VOCODER). Rather than synthesizing speech from scratch, this machine operated by accepting incoming speech and breaking it into its spectral components. In the late 1960s and early 1970s, bands and solo artists began using the VOCODER to blend speech with notes played on a synthesizer.

==== Singing computer ====
At Bell Laboratories, Max Matthews worked with researchers Kelly and Lochbaum to develop a model of the vocal tract to study how its properties contributed to speech generation. Using the model of the vocal tract,—a method, which would come to be known as physical modeling synthesis, in which a computer estimates the formants and spectral content of each word based on information about the vocal model, including various applied filters representing the vocal tract—to make a computer (an IBM 704) sing for the first time in 1962. The computer performed a rendition of "Daisy Bell".

==== CHANT at IRCAM ====
At IRCAM in France, researchers developed software called CHANT (French for sing), the first version of which ran between 1979 and 1983. CHANT was based FOF (Fomant ond Formatique) synthesis, in which the peak frequencies of a sound are created and shaped using granular synthesis—as opposed to filtering frequencies to create speech.

==== Concatenation synthesis using MIDI ====
Through the 1980s and 1990s, as MIDI devices became commercially available, speech was generated by mapping MIDI data to samples of the components of speech stored in sample libraries.

=== Vocal synthesis after 2010s ===
"When Spring Comes" (2022) by Jamie Paige featuring vocals from the Synthesizer V AI voice bank ANRI, an example of artificial intelligence's applications in singing synthesis.

In the 2010s, singing synthesis technology took advantage of the advances in artificial intelligence, deep listening and machine learning, to better represent the nuances of the human voice. New high-fidelity sample libraries combined with digital audio workstations facilitate editing in fine detail, such as shifting of formants, adjustment of vibrato, and adjustments to vowels and consonants. Sample libraries for various languages and various accents are available. With advancements in vocal synthesis, artists sometimes use sample libraries in lieu of backing singers.

== Synthesizers and drum machines ==
=== Synthesizers ===
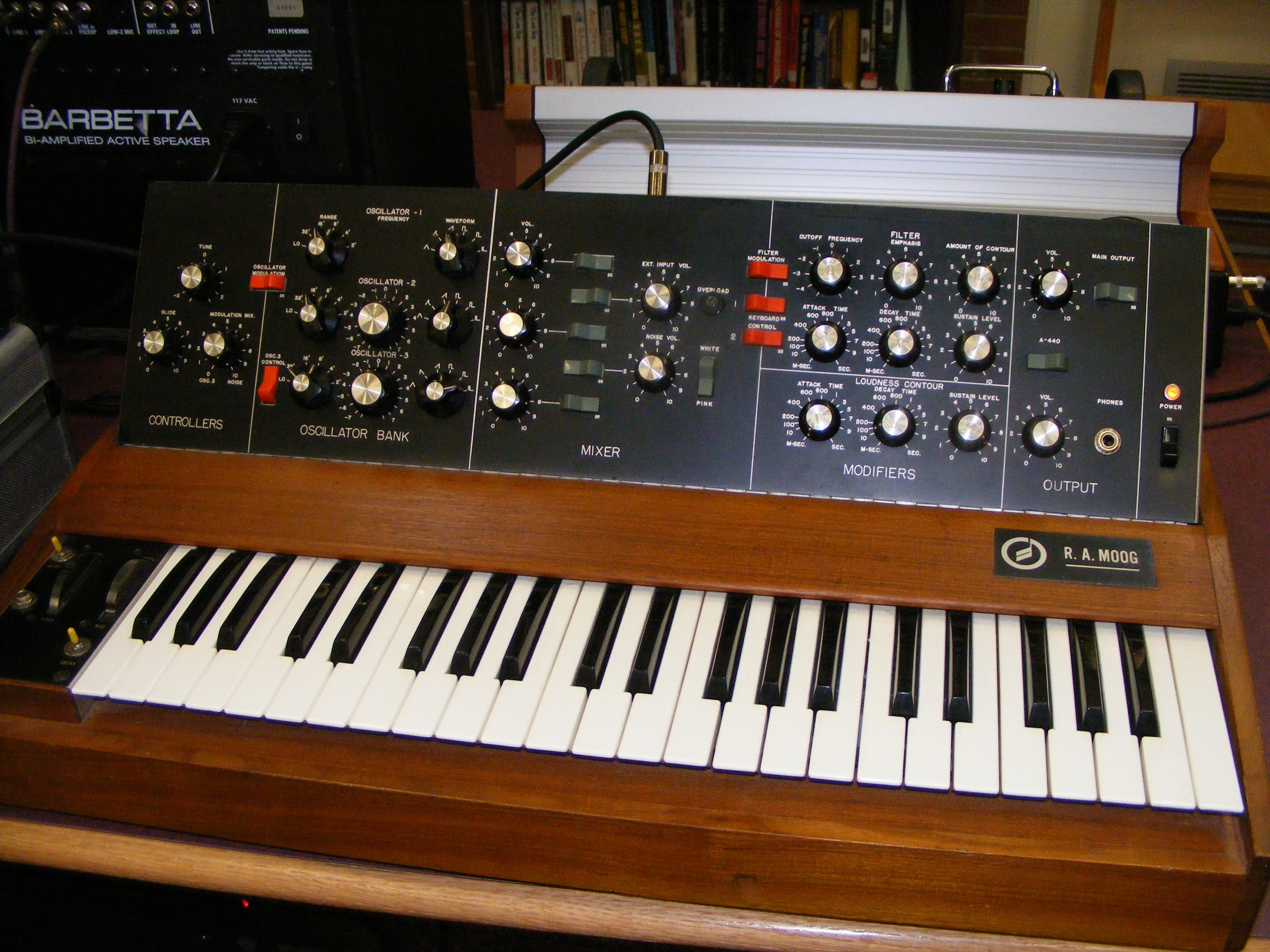
Early Minimoog synthesizer by R. A. Moog Inc. from 1970

A synthesizer is an electronic musical instrument that generates electric signals that are converted to sound through instrument amplifiers and loudspeakers or headphones. Synthesizers may either imitate existing sounds (instruments, vocal, natural sounds, etc.), or generate new electronic timbres or sounds that did not exist before. They are often played with an electronic musical keyboard, but they can be controlled via a variety of other input devices, including sequencers, instrument controllers, fingerboards, guitar synthesizers, wind controllers, and electronic drums. Synthesizers without built-in controllers are often called sound modules, and are controlled using a controller device.

Synthesizers use various methods to generate a signal. Among the most popular waveform synthesis techniques are subtractive synthesis, additive synthesis, wavetable synthesis, frequency modulation synthesis, phase distortion synthesis, physical modeling synthesis and sample-based synthesis or a variant, granular synthesis. Synthesizers are used in many genres of pop, rock and dance music. Contemporary classical music composers from the 20th and 21st centuries write compositions for synthesizer.

=== Drum machines ===
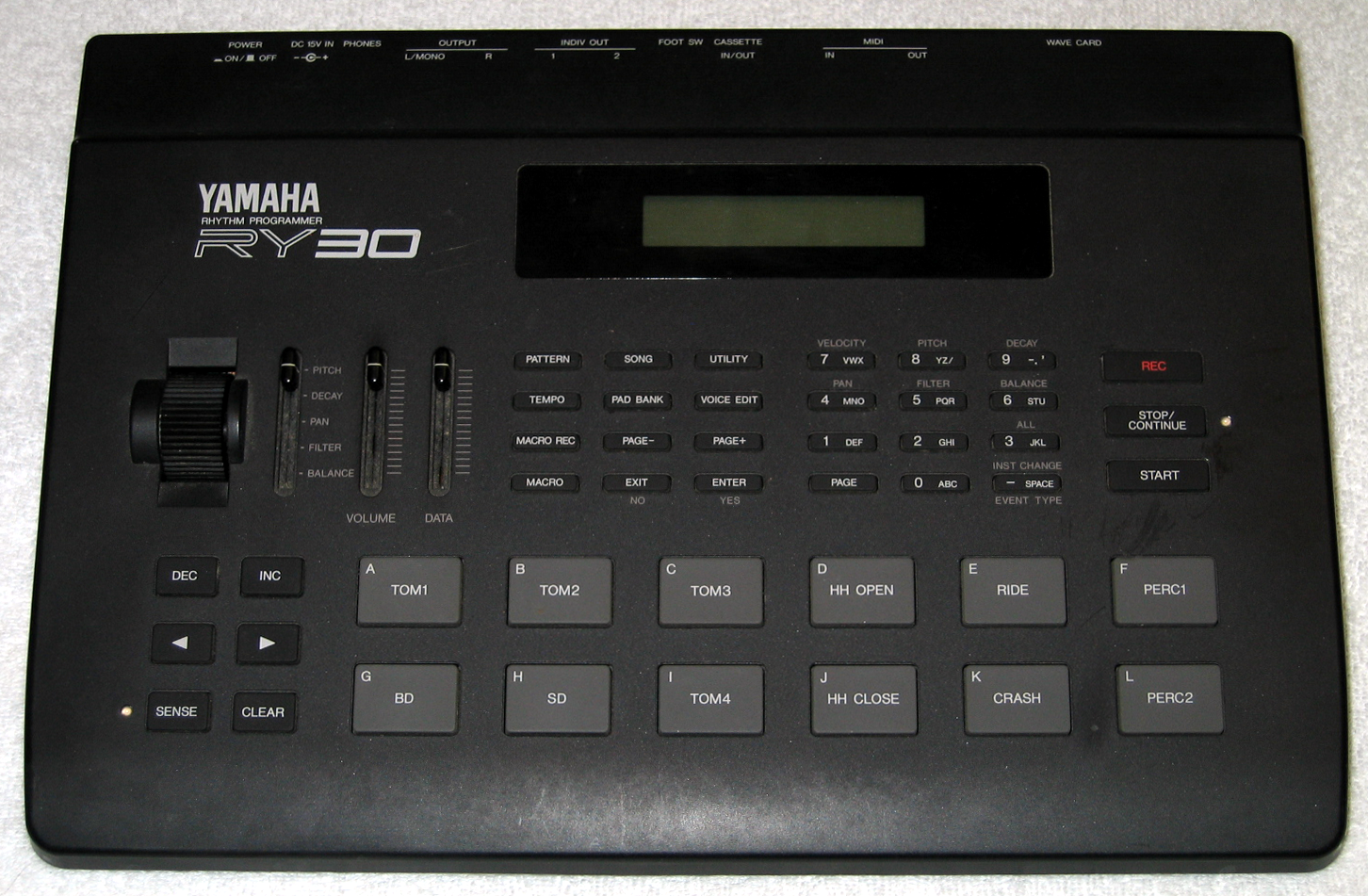
Yamaha RY30 drum machine

A drum machine is an electronic musical instrument designed to imitate the sound of drums, cymbals and other percussion instruments. Drum machines generate drum and cymbal sounds in a rhythm and tempo that is programmed by a musician. Drum machines are most commonly associated with electronic dance music genres such as house music, but are also used in many other genres. They are also used when session drummers are not available or if the production cannot afford the cost of a professional drummer. In the 2010s, most modern drum machines are sequencers with a sample playback (often a rompler) or synthesizer component that specializes in the reproduction of drum timbres.

Electro-mechanical drum machines were first developed in 1949, with the invention of the Chamberlin Rhythmate. Transistorized electronic drum machines Seeburg Select-A-Rhythm appeared in 1964.

Classic drum machines include the Korg Mini Pops SR-120, PAiA Programmable Drum Set, Roland CR-78, LinnDrum, Roland TR-909, Oberheim DMX, E-MU SP-12, Alesis HR-16, and Elektron SPS1 Machinedrum (in chronological order).

==== Drum machines in Japan ====
Roland's TR-808 and TR-909 significantly changed the landscape of rhythm production, shaping genres like hip-hop and electronic dance music. Korg's KPR-77 and DDD-1 also made an impact. These drum machines were known for their distinctive sound and affordability. Over time, Japanese companies continued to innovate, producing increasingly sophisticated and user-friendly drum machines, such as the Roland TR-8 and Korg Volca Beats. Sly and the Family Stone's 1971 album There's a Riot Goin' On helped to popularize the sound of early drum machines, along with Timmy Thomas' 1972 R&B hit "Why Can't We Live Together" and George McCrae's 1974 disco hit "Rock Your Baby" which used early Roland rhythm machines.

== Sampling technology after 1980s ==
Sampling has its roots in France with the sound experiments carried out by musique concrète practitioners.

Digital sampling technology, introduced in the 1970s, has become a staple of music production in the 2000s. Devices that use sampling, record a sound digitally (often a musical instrument, such as a piano or flute being played), and replay it when a key or pad on a controller device (e.g., an electronic keyboard, electronic drum pad, etc.) is pressed or triggered. Samplers can alter the sound using various audio effects and audio processing.

In the 1980s, when the technology was still in its infancy, digital samplers cost tens of thousands of dollars and they were only used by the top recording studios and musicians. These were out of the price range of most musicians. Early samplers include the 8-bit Electronic Music Studios MUSYS-3 circa 1970, Computer Music Melodian in 1976, Fairlight CMI in 1979, Emulator I in 1981, Synclavier II Sample-to-Memory (STM) option circa 1980, Ensoniq Mirage in 1984, and Akai S612 in 1985. The latter's successor, the Emulator II (released in 1984), listed for US$8,000 equivalent to $24,792 in 2025. Other samplers were released during this period with high price tags, such as the K2000 and K2500.

Some important hardware samplers include the Kurzweil K250, Akai MPC60, Ensoniq Mirage, Ensoniq ASR-10, Akai S1000, E-mu Emulator, and Fairlight CMI.

One of the biggest uses of sampling technology was by hip-hop music DJs and performers in the 1980s. Before affordable sampling technology was readily available, DJs would use a technique pioneered by Grandmaster Flash to manually repeat certain parts in a song by juggling between two separate turntables. This can be considered as an early precursor of sampling. In turn, this turntablism technique originates from Jamaican dub music in the 1960s and was introduced to American hip hop in the 1970s.

Advanced sample libraries have made complete performances of orchestral compositions possible that sound similar to a live performance. Modern sound libraries give musicians the ability to use the sounds of almost any instrument in their productions.

=== Sampling technology in Japan ===
Early samplers include the 12-bit Toshiba LMD-649 in 1981. The first affordable sampler in Japan was the Ensoniq Mirage in 1984. The Akai S612 became available in 1985 and retailed for US$895 (equivalent to $2,679 in 2025}. Other companies soon released affordable samplers, including Oberheim DPX-1 in 1987, and offerings from Korg, Casio, Yamaha, and Roland. Some important hardware samplers in Japan include the Akai Z4/Z8, Roland V-Synth and Casio FZ-1.

== MIDI ==
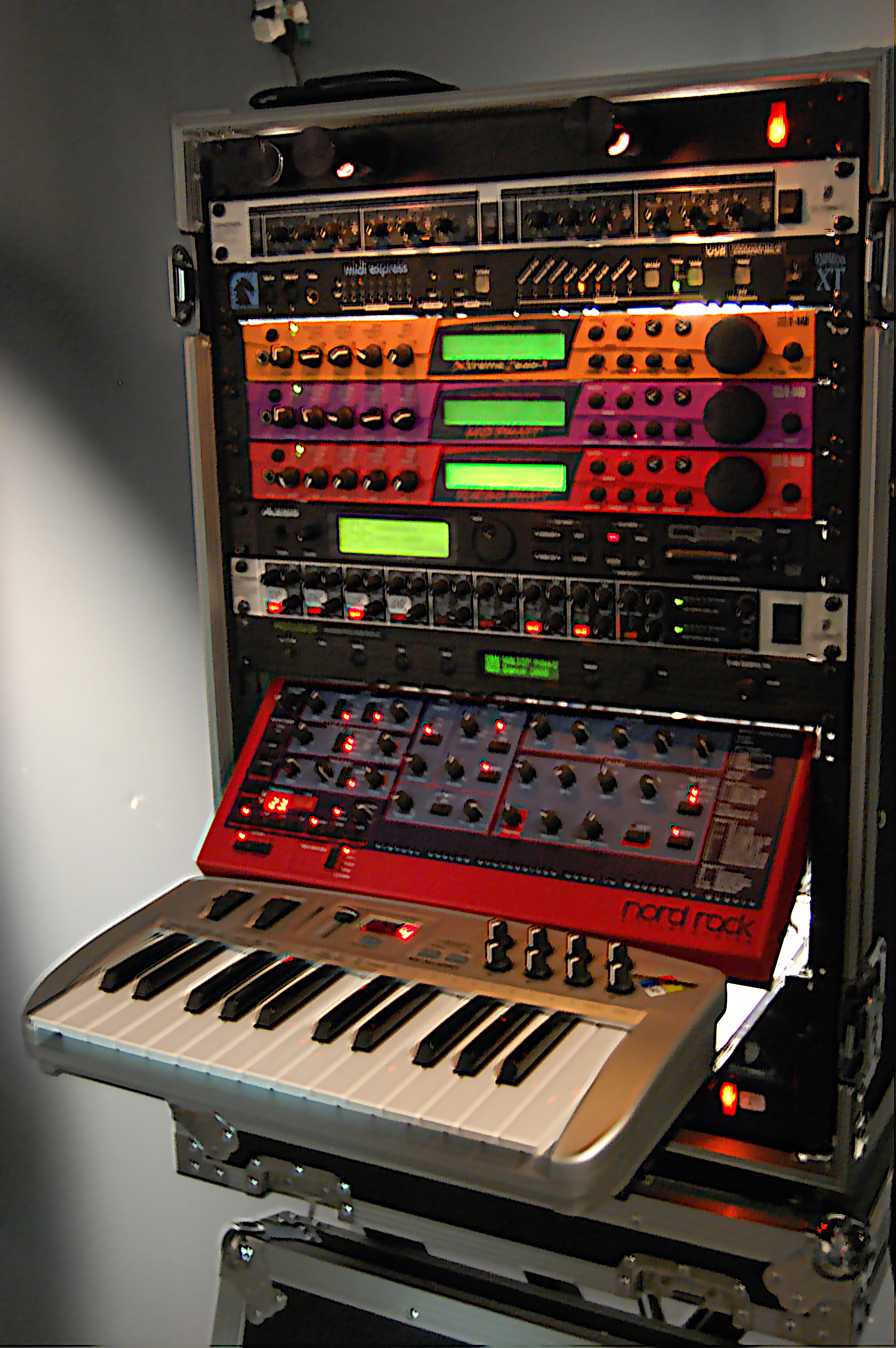
MIDI allows multiple instruments to be played from a single controller (often a keyboard, as pictured here), which makes stage setups much more portable. This system fits into a single rack case, but prior to the advent of MIDI, it may have required four separate, heavy full-size keyboard instruments.

MIDI has been the musical instrument industry standard interface since the 1980s through to the present day. It dates back to June 1981, when Roland Corporation founder Ikutaro Kakehashi proposed the concept of standardization to Oberheim Electronics founder Tom Oberheim and Sequential Circuits president Dave Smith. In October 1981, Kakehashi, Oberheim and Smith discussed the concept with representatives from Yamaha, Korg and Kawai. In 1983, the MIDI standard was unveiled by Kakehashi and Smith.

MIDI is supported on computers and in software including music instruction software, MIDI sequencing software, music notation software, hard disk recording and editing software, patch editor and sound library software, computer-assisted composition software, and virtual instruments.

== Computers in music technology after the 1980s ==
Following the widespread adoption of MIDI, computer-based MIDI editors and sequencers were developed. MIDI-to-CV/Gate converters were then used to enable analog synthesizers to be controlled by a MIDI sequencer.

Reduced prices in personal computers caused many users to turn away from the more expensive workstations. Advancements in technology have increased the speed of hardware processing and the capacity of memory units. Software developers write new, more powerful programs for sequencing, recording, notating, and mastering music.

Digital audio workstation software, such as Pro Tools, Logic, and many others, has gained popularity in recent years. Such programs allow the user to record sound through an audio interface, which may then be layered and organized along a timeline and edited on the computer.

Digital music can be edited and processed using a multitude of audio effects. Contemporary classical music sometimes uses computer-generated sounds—either pre-recorded or generated and manipulated live—in conjunction or juxtaposed on classical acoustic instruments like the cello or violin. Music is scored with commercially available notation software.

In addition to the digital audio workstations and music notation software, which facilitate the creation of fixed media (material that does not change each time it is performed), software facilitating interactive or generative music continues to emerge. Composition based on conditions or rules (algorithmic composition) has given rise to software that can automatically generate music based on input conditions or rules. Thus, the resulting music evolves each time conditions change. Examples of this technology include software designed for writing music for video games—where music evolves as a player advances through a level or when certain characters appear—or music generated from artificial intelligence trained to convert biometrics like EEG or ECG readings into music. Other examples of generative music technology include the use of sensors connected to computer and artificial intelligence to generate music based on captured data, such as environmental factors, the movements of dancers, or physical inputs from a digital device such as a mouse or game controller. Software applications offering capabilities for generative and interactive music include SuperCollider, Max/MSP/Jitter, and Processing. Interactive music is made possible through physical computing, where the data from the physical world affects a computer's output and vice versa.

== Timeline ==
- c.1920 : Leon Theremin invented the prototype of the Theremin
- 1944 : Halim El-Dabh produces earliest electroacoustic tape music
- 1952 : Harry F. Olson and Herbert Belar invent the RCA Synthesizer
- 1952 : Osmand Kendal develops the Composer-Tron for the Marconi Company
- 1956 : Raymond Scott develops the Clavivox
- 1958 : Yevgeny Murzin along with several colleagues create the ANS synthesizer
- 1959 : Wurlitzer manufactures The Sideman, the first commercial electro-mechanical drum machine
- 1963 : The Mellotron starts to be manufactured in London
- 1964 : The Moog synthesizer is released
- 1968 : King Tubby pioneers dub music, an early form of popular electronic music
- 1971 : ARP 2600 is manufactured
- 1982 : Sony and Philips introduce compact disc
- 1982 : Introduction of MIDI
- 1986 : Yamaha releases the DMP7, the first commercial digital console
- 1988 : Digidesign markets Sound Tools

=== Timeline in Japan ===
- 1963 : Keio Electronic Laboratories (later Korg) produces the DA-20
- 1964 : Ikutaro Kakehashi debuts Ace Tone R-1 Rhythm Ace, the first electronic drum
- 1965 : Nippon Columbia patents an early electronic drum machine
- 1966 : Korg releases Donca-Matic DE-20, an early electronic drum machine
- 1967 : Ace Tone releases FR-1 Rhythm Ace, the first drum machine to enter popular music
- 1967 : First PCM recorder developed by NHK
- 1969 : Matsushita engineer Shuichi Obata invents the first direct-drive turntable, Technics SP-10
- 1973 : Yamaha release Yamaha GX-1, the first polyphonic synthesizer
- 1974 : Yamaha build first digital synthesizer
- 1977 : Roland release MC-8, an early microprocessor-driven CV/Gate digital sequencer
- 1978 : Roland releases CR-78, the first microprocessor-driven drum machine
- 1979 : Casio releases VL-1, the first commercial digital synthesizer
- 1980 : Roland releases TR-808, the most widely used drum machine in popular music
- 1980 : Roland introduces DCB protocol and DIN interface with TR-808
- 1980 : Yamaha releases GS-1, the first FM digital synthesizer
- 1980 : Kazuo Morioka creates Firstman SQ-01, the first bass synth with a sequencer
- 1981 : Roland releases TB-303, a bass synthesizer that lays foundations for acid house music
- 1981 : Toshiba's LMD-649, the first PCM digital sampler in Japan, introduced with Yellow Magic Orchestra's Technodelic
- 1982 : First MIDI synthesizers released, Roland Jupiter-6 and Prophet 600
- 1983 : Roland releases MSQ-700, the first MIDI sequencer
- 1983 : Roland releases TR-909, the first MIDI drum machine
- 1983 : Yamaha releases DX7, the first commercially successful digital synthesizer
- 1985 : Akai releases the Akai S612, a digital sampler
- 1988 : Akai introduces the Akai MPC 60, the first of Akai's MPC series of sampler workstations
- 1994 : Yamaha releases the ProMix 01 digital mixing console

== See also ==
- Comparison of free software for audio
- List of music software
