= Stanley Jungleib =

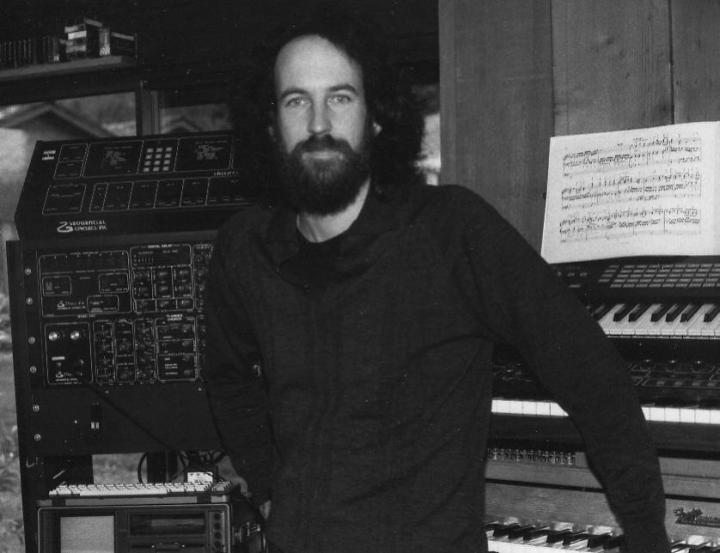
- Stanley Jungleib in Studio
- Born: Stanley Young; May 15, 1953 (age 73)
- Education: University of California, Santa Cruz, 1975
- Occupations: CEO Seer Systems and SJ Laboratories
- Known for: Software Synthesis, Analog Synthesizers, Psychoenergetics
- Website: www.jungleib.com

Stanley Jungleib (born Stanley Young, May 15, 1953) is an American musician, philosopher, author, inventor, and entrepreneur. He is best known for wide-reaching influence in digital music and synthesizer design. Most notably his commitment to software techniques liberated digital audio from the desktop computer, enabling broad applications ranging from game platforms and laptops to cell phones and other miniature devices. Currently he is expanding the field of psychoenergetic computing and writes on philosophy, music, technology, communications, and politics.

== Early life ==
Stanley Jungleib was born to Milton Young and Josephine (Josie) Gressani Young, on May 15, 1953 in San Mateo, California. Jungleib expressed precocious talents in music, technology, politics, and philosophy. He performed on piano, pipe organ, drums and orchestral percussion. By 1969 he was an Advanced Amateur Radio Operator (WA6LVC) and had earned his Second Class Radiotelephone Broadcast license. Jungleib participated in the Peace Movement and Anti-Vietnam war activism. Simultaneously, he audited college-level philosophy classes and delved into Judaism to anchor his status as a conscientious objector. (Preserving that heritage, he legally changed his surname from Young to its original Jungleib.)

Serving as youth chairman for a councilmen's campaign, he learned "back-room" intricacies of city and county politics. Thus, after a two-year effort, he successfully drove the protection of the open space in San Mateo County California known as Sugarloaf Mountain). His strategy exposed corruption and graft, resulting in the ouster of the entire (Republican) city council. This operation brought him an invitation from the San Mateo County Democratic Central Committee, making him the first eighteen-year-old in the State to be so appointed.

== Education ==
A protege of Existentialist Peter Koestenbaum by 1971, Jungleib took lower-division Honors studies at San Jose State University, majoring in philosophy but also studying pipe organ with Philip Simpson. Himself a student of Marie-Claire Alain, Simpson impressed upon Jungleib the sonic power of the French Impressionist organ school. With wood-working and electronics training, Jungleib qualified as an apprentice organ builder in Ft. Worth, Texas, learning the fine art and complexities of custom instrument construction. In retrospect, this pipe organ experience laid solid groundwork for his future endeavors in synthesis and instrument design.

Jungleib transferred to the University of California, Santa Cruz in 1973 where he earned a bachelor's degree in philosophy with Thesis and Major honors in 1975. From 1975 to 1976 he taught two original metaphysics courses exploring Immanuel Kant, Arthur Schopenhauer, Ludwig Wittgenstein, and Eastern philosophy in light of theories of philosophical reticence. Jungleib then pursued graduate work in philosophy at the University of Rochester, advised by Richard Clyde Taylor and Lewis White Beck. As a Graduate Fellow, he taught undergraduates Introductory, Modern, and Eastern philosophy courses while focusing on Plato, Metaphysics, and the Philosophy of Language.

== Career ==
=== Early work ===
He began his Silicon Valley technical career in 1977, as a trainer for Deterline Corporation. Here he behaviorally revised radar and other non-ordinance instruction for the U.S. Army Intelligence Center and U.S. Navy. Next he edited and wrote for AMPEX corporation, creating documentation for broadcast audio and video recorders. While studying emerging mini- and micro-computers at Stanford University and Foothill College he created a publications department for clinical chemistry analyzer maker Chemetrics.

In 1979 Jungleib joined Sequential Circuits Inc., a prominent synthesizer company, where he managed publications for the company's musical instruments such as the Prophet-5, and other Engineering programs. His detailed documentation helped solidify the company's success among music's most influential artists of the 1970s and '80s. Jungleib's tenure at Sequential also evolved into over 30 years of leadership in music synthesis, including coordinating MIDI (1983), General MIDI (1990), and ultimately, inventing real-time processor-based synthesis (1993) and its means of distribution (1997).

After KORG absorbed Sequential, Jungleib consulted as Product Planner to finish the Wavestation and develop Sondius® physically-modeled sounds. Now independent, he consulted on MIDI tools for Silicon Graphics, further exploring multi-media design by becoming an early Macromind Director certified developer. Director synchronization problems motivated his first patent (#5,286,908), which forged bi-directional linkage between graphics and music programs. He employed this technology to implement California Recording Institute's visual virtual mixing system.

=== Seer Systems ===
In 1991, while serving as MIDI and Audio Curriculum Director for Cogswell Polytechnical College, semiconductor giant Intel approached Jungleib to invent an unprecedented real-time software music synthesizer—within the limits of personal computing. At first the project targeted a DSP chip, but by mid-1992 the platform had become the 486 CPU itself. To achieve this paradigm shift, Jungleib tuned the specification, selected the development team, and founded Seer Systems.

As CEO, Jungleib sustained Seer Systems' vision of today's music software development by responding to evolving technical and business realities in four phases. First, in the OEM relationship with Intel to license Seer's 486 Satie synthesizer he negotiated eight development agreements (1993–94) . This instrument, with its intelligent, adaptive loading scheme successfully proved the viability of Intel's “Native Signal Processing” initiative, and proved that it was impossible to obtain similar performance under Windows. Jungleib writes that in late 1994 Intel's CEO Andrew Grove told him, “If you ever get another good idea like that, call me.” In fact, Jungleib's development had created for Intel its main weapon against Microsoft in their highly publicized ‘Native Signal Processing War” (1994–95).

Microsoft won, forcing Jungleib to negotiate an amicable separation from Intel while simultaneously designing a new, Pentium-based synthesizer architecture. He quickly wooed Creative Labs [div. Creative Technology Ltd], who in 1995 valued his six-month-old restart at $6M. Thereafter, Seer System's second-generation OEM-licensed instruments enabled half of the functionality of the AWE64 and other sound cards, establishing new software synthesizer distribution quantity records in the tens of millions.

By 1997, corporate issues and shortfalls forced Jungleib to recreate Seer Systems as a 15-person retail operation to distribute its third generation; as an unprecedented professional software synthesizer. Jungleib included the promising Sondius® physical modeling algorithms he had already researched. The resulting “Reality” software synthesizer shattered all quality records, including that of professional hardware. The instrument captured Electronic Musician's 1998 Editor's Choice Award. Seer System's musical accomplishment signified an utter revolution in the way computers could deliver music and audio, and catalyzed the industry's conversion from “sound cards” and racks of hardware to handheld software instrumentation. Jungleib liberated audio technology from hardware dependence for consumers and then for professionals, by demonstrating the means to create scalable (adjustable-quality) music and sound for laptops and mobile devices such as phones and tablets.

Since 1996 Jungleib had consulted with Opcode to merge his synthesizer with their Galaxy editor and StudioVision DAW (Digital Audio Workstation) system. When that partner was acquired he by necessity expanded and detailed how a complete software-based delivery system should work. This fourth architecture, covering scalable music distribution, became his second patent, #5,886,274. Jungleib has licensed his system to Microsoft, Yamaha, several cell phone companies, and successfully defended its re-examination after a seven-year challenge by the Electronic Frontier Foundation (EFF).

In its 2017, February issue Electronic Musician gave Seer Systems Reality a 2017 Editors’ Choice Legacy Award, terming the 1997 introduction “a game-changing product—an unprecedented achievement—that has shaped the way we make music.”

=== SJ Laboratories LLC ===
In 2005 Jungleib radically shifted research interest to peculiarly-sensitive semiconductor memories. Conversations with Dr. William Tiller covered Tesla-inspired technologies, aura reading, and water structuring. In April 2006 Tiller asked Jungleib to re-design the electronic devices he was using for his intentional amplification experiments. During this work Jungleib found fatal quality issues with the existing circuitry that might cast doubt on Tiller's findings. This discovery resulted in a split from Tiller to take the promising technology in a new direction.

For this initiative Jungleib partnered with Joel Bruce Wallach, creator of Powerforms, to pursue a proper patent. In 2013, seven years of research on a circuit for analyzing and affecting subtle energy resonance resulted in the USPTO's first recognition of psychoenergetics, #8,362,766. He has published three research papers with Towards a Science of Consciousness (2009, 2010, 2011). Continuing work at SJ Laboratories suggests applications for this technology ranging from adaptive music synthesis to materials processing and nanotechnology, perhaps including functions such as artificial intelligence and quantum computing.

From 2006 to 2009 Jungleib studied and consulted with Dr. John Diamond, founder of Behavioral Kinesiology, on developing subtle energy tools. Having participated in hundreds of kinesiological tests, Jungleib may demonstrate some in his talks on philosophy, music and psychoenergetics.

Turning to prediction markets, Jungleib's was one of three sites that in 2012 independently discovered the market manipulation which led to the U.S. closing political gaming. Confirming his breadth as a polymath and futurist, in 2013 Jungleib scored in the top 2% of IARPA's Forecasting World Events competition.

On 2018 July 6 the 40M-reader OZY.COM featured Jungleib's new patent as a medical breakthrough, at https://www.ozy.com/rising-stars/the-inventor-who-wants-to-measure-your-vibe/86389

== Bibliography ==
Music Possible: A Digital Analysis of Tonality 1986
General MIDI AR Publications Madison etc. 1995 ISBN 0-89579-310-5

== Articles ==
Introducing the MIDIE&MM, May 1983 (The first article about MIDI ever published.)
MIDI Hardware Fundamentals Polyphony, June 1983
Frequency Counter and Display for Microprocessors Radio Electronics, September 1983
Mac the Music Tools Introduction Rittor Japan, January 1984
Beyond User Friendliness Keyboard Magazine, April 1986
Introduction to Vector Synthesis Polyphony, November 1986
The MIDI Standard Computer Music Journal, July 1983
MIDI Sample Dump Standard Computer Music Journal, October, 1986
Stanford CCRMA Keyboard Magazine, June 1987
Cognitive Radio Jameco, March 2012
GOP Manipulated Prediction Markets November 2012

== Discography ==
Music for the Inner Film (1992)

Qwire (1996)

== Industry ==
MIDI Manufacturers Association

1982-1983 Founder;

1990-1991 Board Member, Treasurer, Journal Editor;

1994-1995 Committee Chairman, GM Level 2
