= Seer Systems =

- Industry: software
- Founded: 1979
- Founder: Stanley Jungleib
- Headquarters: United States
- Key people: Dave Smith
- Website: www.seersystems.com

Seer Systems developed the world's first commercial software synthesizer in the early 1990s. Working in conjunction with Intel, then Creative Labs, and finally as an independent software developer and retailer, Seer helped lay the groundwork for a major shift in synthesis technology: using personal computers, rather than dedicated synthesizer keyboards, to create music.

== History ==
Seer's founder, Stanley Jungleib, joined the staff of Sequential Circuits (creators of the groundbreaking Prophet-5 synthesizer) in 1979. Working as Publications Manager, he drafted the technical manuals for all Sequential products. Jungleib was a charter member of the International MIDI Association (which later became the MIDI Manufacturer's Association) and helped to establish the MIDI protocol. In 1992, Jungleib was invited to teach a seminar on MIDI at Intel Architecture Labs. This led to the launching of an Intel project to create a software synthesizer for the 80486 processor. Jungleib assembled a development team, and at the end of 1992 founded Seer Systems to work on the project. The resulting synthesizer, code-named Satie, was demonstrated by Andrew Grove in his keynote speech at Comdex in 1994. Intel discontinued the project in 1995, possibly due to friction with Microsoft over Native Signal Processing.

Seer began afresh with a Pentium-based architecture. That same year, the founder of Sequential Circuits, Dave Smith, joined as President.

Seer struck a distribution deal with Creative Labs in 1996, which contributed to strong financial results for the AWE64. Over 10 million software synthesizers, the "Creative WaveSynth", were shipped as a result. It was the first publicly available synthesizer to use Sondius WaveGuide technology developed at Stanford's CCRMA.

In 1997, Seer released Reality, the world's first professional software synthesizer for the PC. Reality won the 1998 Editors' Choice Award from Electronic Musician Magazine. Industry veteran Craig Anderton called it a "groundbreaking product." 1999 saw the introduction of SurReal 1.0, an affordable player for Reality and SoundFont instrument sounds, the release of Reality 1.5, which added web features, more polyphony and better sound card support, and the issuance of U.S. patent 5,886,274 ("System and Method for Generating, Distributing, Storing and Performing Musical Work Files"/Inventor, Jungleib/Assignee, Seer).

But by 2000, legal struggles with hostile investors, limited distribution and piracy caused Seer to cease active development, suspend sales through retail outlets, and briefly shift to an online sales model. An unrelated company, Seer Music Systems, founded by Canadian engineer Ian Grant, acquired the distribution rights and continues to offer legacy demos and support.

Since 2003, Seer's primary focus has been upon protecting its intellectual property (the '274 patent). Over several years, and following related litigation, the technology was licensed to Beatnik (2004), Microsoft (2006) and Yamaha (2007).

== Products ==
=== Reality ===
Announced in January 1997, Reality ran on Pentium PCs under Windows 95/98. Version 1.0 offered multiple types of synthesis, including PCM wavetable, subtractive, modal synthesis and FM, as well as physical modeling via the Sondius WaveGuide technology licensed from Stanford University. Reality was the first synthesizer able to simultaneously play multiple synthesis types on multiple MIDI channels in real-time.

Reality 1.5 was released in 1999, adding more polyphony, support for a broader range of sound cards and the ability to load and play SoundFont 2.0 samples. It also incorporated SeerMusic, enabling fast Internet playback of music files using a combination of MIDI and Reality synthesis data.

In its 2017, February issue Electronic Musician gave Seer Systems Reality a 2017 Editors' Choice Legacy Award, terming the 1997 introduction "a game-changing product—an unprecedented achievement—that has shaped the way we make music."

=== SurReal ===
In February 1999, Seer announced SurReal, a playback-oriented version of the Reality synthesizer engine. It was designed to be more user-friendly, and had fewer controls, but could load and play complex Reality soundbanks as well as SoundFonts. SurReal also supported SeerMusic for internet delivery.

=== SeerMusic ===
SeerMusic was introduced in January 1998. By combining MIDI performance data, synthesis parameters and sample data, music playback files could be significantly smaller than standard compressed digital audio data.
