= Wavetable =

Wavetable may refer to:

- Wavetable synthesis, a sound synthesis technique used to create periodic waveforms often used in music synthesizers
- Sample-based synthesis, a form of audio synthesis using sampled sounds or instruments

== See also ==
- Waveform, the shape of an acoustic or electronic signal's graph as a function of time
- Digital waveguide synthesis, the synthesis of audio using a digital waveguide
- Lookup table, an array that replaces runtime computation
