= Georg Essl =

Austrian computer scientist and musician

Georg Essl (born March 1, 1972) is an Austrian computer scientist and musician, who works in the areas of human-computer interaction, acoustics, mobile computing and mobile music. He is a visiting research professor at the College of Letters & Sciences at the University of Wisconsin–Milwaukee, and he is also affiliated with the Center for 21st Century Studies. Prior to that he was an assistant professor at the University of Michigan.

== Life and work ==
Georg Essl completed a doctoral degree at Princeton University in the United States. Under Perry Cook's direction, Essl wrote a doctoral thesis on the subject of physical modeling of musical sounds. For this, he developed a new sound synthesis method called banded waveguide synthesis.

After completing his doctoral degree in 2002, he taught computer science, music, and digital art at the University of Florida. Then in 2003 he went to the newly founded MIT Media Lab Europe in Dublin, Ireland, to develop new electronic musical instruments with Sile O'Modhrain. A whole series of innovative musical instruments were created. One of the most successful of these was the PebbleBox instrument, which was displayed at the Victoria and Albert Museum in London in 2005. After the closing of Media Lab Europe, Essl conducted research at the Telekom Innovation Laboratories at Technische Universität Berlin. There he did groundbreaking work in mobile music, in which conventional programmable mobile cell phones are employed as musical instruments.

Georg Essl is one of the co-founders of the "MoPho" movement. MoPhos are orchestras of mobile devices. Together with Ge Wang and Henri Penttinen, he founded the Stanford Mobile Phone Orchestra and was later also founder and director of the Berlin Mobile Phone Orchestra and the Michigan Mobile Phone Ensemble. He further served as advisor and consultant for the iPhone App company Smule, which developed musical instruments such as the ocarina and the leaf trombone.

Since 2009, Essl teaches computer science and music at the University of Michigan. He is the senior architect and developer of the mobile music platforms SpeedDial and urMus. He has contributed ideas from topology to the field of sound synthesis, for example showing how circle maps can be used to implement nonlinear oscillators for generating tones ranging from simple to chaotic. Essl's sound synthesis methods are employed by composers such as Paul Lansky, Brad Garton, Matt Burtner, Juraj Kojs and Ted Coffey and are available in many synthesis programs such as the Synthesis ToolKit (STK), PeRColate, and ChucK.

Georg Essl is not related to the composer Karlheinz Essl.

== Links ==
- Georg Essl's Website
- Michigan Mobile Phone Ensemble
- Stanford Mobile Phone Orchestra
- urMus: A meta-environment for developing mobile interactions
