= Stefania Serafin =

Italian professor

- Citizenship: Italy
- Education: MA from IRCAM in 1997. PhD from Stanford University in 2004
- Alma mater: PhD in Computer Based Music Theory and Acoustics from Stanford University
- Occupations: professor and researcher at Technical University of Denmark
- Employer: Technical University of Denmark
- Board member of: Project leader at NordicSMC and President at Sound and Music Computing Network

Stefania Serafin is a professor at the Department of Engineering Technology at Technical University of Denmark.

== Education ==
Stefania Serafin completed her master's degree in acoustics, computer science and signal processing applied to music, from IRCAM (Paris) in 1997. Following, she received her PhD in computer-based music theory and acoustics from Stanford University in 2004.

== Career ==
In 2026, Stefania Serafin joined the Technical University of Denmark, Department of Engineering Technology. In 2018, Stefania Serafin was employed as professor at the Department of Architecture, Design and Media technology at Aalborg University in Copenhagen. Before becoming a professor Serafin worked as an associate professor and lecturer, also at Aalborg University. As a researcher, her focus lies on multisensory experiences applied to health and culture.

Serafin holds the position as president of the organization, Sound and Music Computing Network, which is a portal for the sound and music computing community. Also, she is the project leader of ‘The Nordic Sound and Music Computing Network (NordicSMC)’, which is a university hub for sound and music computing led by the fields internationally leading researchers from the Nordic countries.

== Selected publications ==
· F. Avanzini, S. Serafin and D. Rocchesso, "Interactive Simulation of rigid body interaction with friction-induced sound generation," in IEEE Transactions on Speech and Audio Processing, vol. 13, no. 5, pp. 1073–1081, Sept. 2005.

· Y. Visell, F. Fontana, B.L. Giordano, R. Nordahl, S. Serafin, R. Bresin, Sound design and perception in walking interactions, International Journal of Human-Computer Studies, Volume 67, Issue 11, 2009, Pages 947–959.

· R. Nordahl, S. Serafin and L. Turchet, "Sound synthesis and evaluation of interactive footsteps for virtual reality applications," 2010 IEEE Virtual Reality Conference (VR), Waltham, MA, 2010, pp. 147–153.

· L. Turchet, R. Nordahl, S. Serafin, A. Berrezag, S. Dimitrov and V. Hayward, "Audio-haptic physically-based simulation of walking on different grounds," 2010 IEEE International Workshop on Multimedia Signal Processing, Saint Malo, 2010, pp. 269–273.
