= Technical Grammy Award =

Special merit Grammy award

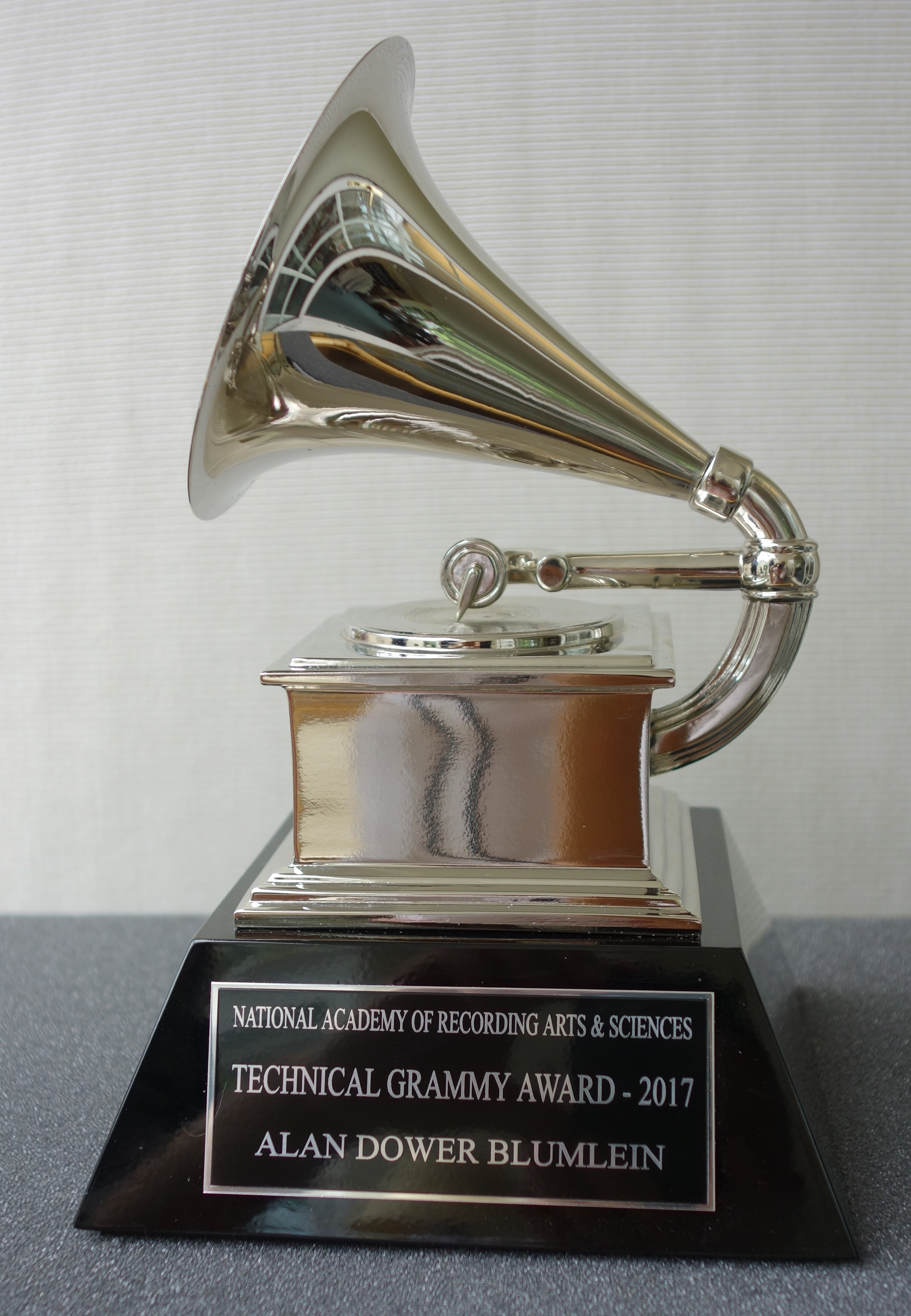
- Awarded for: Contributions of outstanding technical significance to the recording field
- Country: United States
- Presented by: The Recording Academy
- First award: 1994
- Website: www.grammy.com/awards/technical-awards

The Technical Grammy Award is a Special Merit Grammy Award presented to individuals or companies who have made contributions of outstanding technical significance to the recording field. The award was first presented in 1994 to Dr. Thomas G. Stockham Jr. Others who have received this award include Ray Dolby, Ikutaro Kakehashi, Rupert Neve, Les Paul, Phil Ramone, Dr. Robert Moog, Geoff Emerick, Tom Dowd, Bill Putnam, George Massenburg, Roger Linn, Leo Fender and Thomas Alva Edison. Companies honored include AKG, Apple Computer, Digidesign, JBL Professional, Lexicon, Shure Incorporated, and Sony/Philips.

== Technical Grammy recipients ==
The following individuals and companies have received Technical Grammys, listed by year.

Year	Recipient(s)	Ref.
1994	Dr. Thomas G. Stockham	
1995	Ray Dolby	
1997	Rupert Neve	
1998	George Massenburg	
1998	Sony/Philips	
1999	Georg Neumann GmbH	
2000	Bill Putnam, AMS Neve	
2001	Les Paul, Digidesign	
2002	Robert Moog, Apple Computer Inc.	
2003	Geoff Emerick, Shure Inc.	
2004	Douglas Sax, Solid State Logic	
2005	Phil Ramone, JBL Professional	
2006	Tom Dowd, Bell Labs/Western Electric	
2007	David M. Smith, Yamaha Corporation	
2008	John Eargle, Ampex Corporation	
2009	Clarence "Leo" Fender, Universal Audio	
2010	Thomas Alva Edison, AKG Acoustics GmbH	
2011	Roger Linn, Waves Audio	
2012	Roger Nichols, Celemony	
2013	Ikutaro Kakehashi and Dave Smith, Royer Labs	
2014	Emile Berliner, Lexicon	
2015	Ray Kurzweil	
2016	Harvey Fletcher, EMT	
2017	Alan Blumlein	
2018	Richard Factor and Anthony Agnello	
2019	Saul Walker	
2020	George Augspurger	
2021	Daniel Weiss	
2023	Audio Engineering Society, Dr. Andy Hildebrand	
2024	Tom Kobayashi, Tom Scott	
2025	Leo Beranek	
2026	John Chowning	
