= Julius Smith =

American professor of music and audio signal processing

Julius O. Smith III
- Born: Julius Orion Smith III; 1953 (age 72–73)
- Education: Rice University (B.S., 1975); Stanford University (M.S., 1978; Ph.D., 1983)
- Known for: Digital waveguide synthesis Shazam audio fingerprinting Closed-form spatial localization Windowed-sinc sampling-rate conversion Sines+noise additive synthesis
- Awards: Fellow, Acoustical Society of America (2003); Fellow, Audio Engineering Society (2008); Richard C. Heyser Memorial Lecturer (2006)
- Scientific career
- Fields: Digital signal processing Music technology Computer music
- Workplaces: Stanford University (CCRMA); NeXT Computer (1986–1991)
- Thesis: Techniques for Digital Filter Design and System Identification with Application to the Violin (1983)
- Doctoral advisor: Gene F. Franklin
- Website: ccrma.stanford.edu/~jos/

Julius Orion Smith III (born 1953) is an American educator and engineer who is Professor Emeritus of Music and, by courtesy, Electrical Engineering at Stanford University's Center for Computer Research in Music and Acoustics (CCRMA). He is known for pioneering digital waveguide synthesis, a physical modeling technique adopted in commercial instruments such as the Yamaha VL-1 synthesizer. Smith is also co-inventor of the core audio-fingerprinting algorithm behind the music-identification service Shazam.

== Education ==
Smith earned a B.S. in electrical engineering from Rice University in 1975 and M.S. and Ph.D. degrees in electrical engineering from Stanford University in 1978 and 1983, respectively. His doctoral dissertation, supervised by Gene F. Franklin, was entitled Techniques for Digital Filter Design and System Identification with Application to the Violin.

== Career ==
=== Early career and NeXT ===
From 1986 to 1991, Smith was a founding member of the Sound and Music Group at NeXT Computer, where he developed real-time signal-processing software for the Music Kit, Sound Library, and other audio software for the NeXTSTEP platform.

=== Academic career ===
Smith joined the Stanford faculty in 1991, becoming an associate professor in 1994, full professor in 2004, and professor emeritus in 2022. At Stanford, he has taught courses in digital signal processing, computer music, and acoustics, while mentoring numerous graduate students who have gone on to careers in academia and industry.

=== Industry involvement ===
Beyond academia, Smith has worked with several audio-technology companies, including:

- Staccato Systems – developed physical modeling synthesis technology licensed by Analog Devices
- Shazam Entertainment – co-invented the core audio fingerprinting algorithm
- moForte – continued development of physical modeling technologies

== Research contributions ==
=== Digital waveguide synthesis ===
Smith's most influential contribution is digital waveguide synthesis, a computationally efficient method for simulating the physics of musical instruments. This technique models wave propagation in strings, tubes, and membranes using digital delay lines and filters. His 1992 Computer Music Journal article formalizing this approach remains a foundational text in the field.

=== Spatial localization ===
Smith's 1987 paper "Closed-Form Least-Squares Source Location Estimation from Range-Difference Measurements" introduced an algebraic solution to the time-difference-of-arrival (TDOA) localization problem. This work has been cited over 1,000 times and is fundamental to applications in radar, sonar, and wireless communications.

=== Sampling-rate conversion ===
At ICASSP 1984, Smith introduced windowed-sinc interpolation for high-quality, time-varying sampling-rate conversion. This method has been widely adopted in commercial sample-rate converters and open-source software such as libsamplerate.

=== Educational contributions ===
Smith has authored four open-access textbooks:

- Mathematics of the Discrete Fourier Transform (2007)
- Introduction to Digital Filters (2007)
- Physical Audio Signal Processing (2010)
- Spectral Audio Signal Processing (2011)

== Honors and recognition ==
- Fellow, Acoustical Society of America (2003) – "for applications of digital signal processing to musical acoustics"
- Fellow, Audio Engineering Society (2008) – "for research contributions in, teaching of, and service relating to digital audio signal processing in music"
- Richard C. Heyser Memorial Lecturer, AES 121st Convention (2006) – delivered lecture on "History and Practice in Digital Sound Synthesis"

== Selected publications ==
=== Books ===
- Smith, Julius O. (2007). Mathematics of the Discrete Fourier Transform (DFT): With Audio Applications (2nd ed.). W3K Publishing. ISBN 978-0-9745607-4-8.
- Smith, Julius O. (2007). Introduction to Digital Filters: With Audio Applications. W3K Publishing. ISBN 978-0-9745607-1-7.
- Smith, Julius O. (2010). Physical Audio Signal Processing: For Virtual Musical Instruments and Audio Effects. W3K Publishing. ISBN 978-0-9745607-2-4.
- Smith, Julius O. (2011). Spectral Audio Signal Processing. W3K Publishing. ISBN 978-0-9745607-3-1.

=== Key papers ===
- Smith, Julius O. (1992). "Physical Modeling Using Digital Waveguides". Computer Music Journal. 16 (4): 74–91. doi:10.2307/3680470. JSTOR 3680470.
- Smith, Julius O.; Abel, Jonathan S. (1987). "Closed-Form Least-Squares Source Location Estimation from Range-Difference Measurements". IEEE Transactions on Acoustics, Speech, and Signal Processing. 35 (12): 1661–1669. doi:10.1109/TASSP.1987.1165089.
- Smith, Julius O. (1983). Techniques for Digital Filter Design and System Identification with Application to the Violin (Ph.D. dissertation). Stanford University.

== See also ==
- Center for Computer Research in Music and Acoustics
- Digital waveguide synthesis
- Physical modeling synthesis
- Shazam (application)
