= Dave Smith (engineer) =

American audio engineer and inventor (1950–2022)

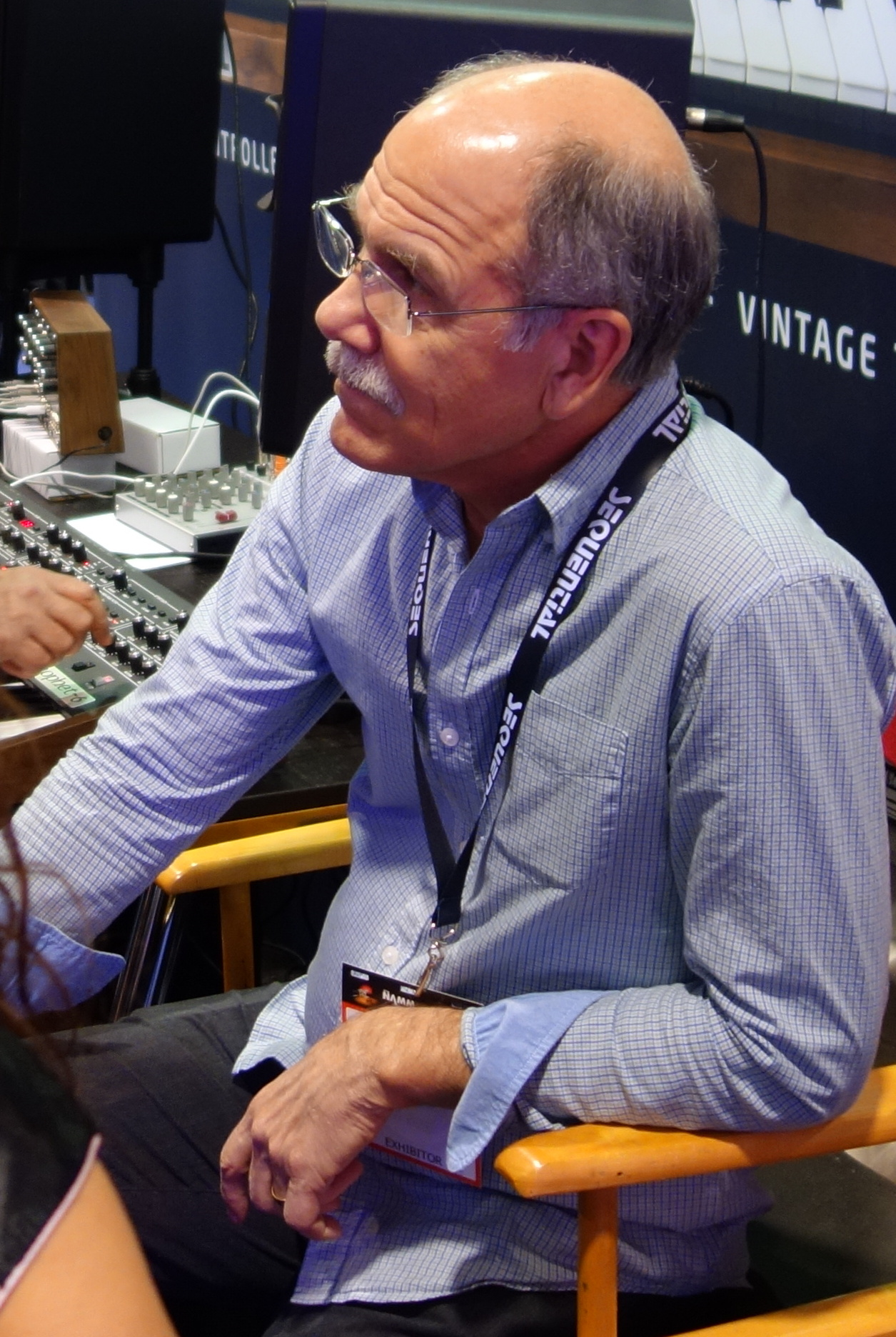
- Smith at the 2015 NAMM Show
- Born: David Joseph Smith; April 2, 1950; San Francisco, California, U.S.
- Died: May 31, 2022 (aged 72); Detroit, Michigan, U.S.
- Education: UC Berkeley, Computer Science, Electrical Engineering
- Occupation: Synthesizer designer

David Joseph Smith (April 2, 1950 – May 31, 2022) was an American engineer and founder of the synthesizer company Sequential. Smith created the first polyphonic synthesizer with fully programmable memory, the Prophet-5, which had a major impact on the music industry. He also led the development of MIDI, a standard interface protocol for synchronizing electronic instruments and audio equipment.

In 2005, Smith was inducted into the Mix Foundation TECnology (Technical Excellence and Creativity) Hall of Fame for the MIDI specification. In 2013, he and the Japanese engineer Ikutaro Kakehashi, the founder of the Roland Corporation, received a Technical Grammy Award for their contributions to the development of MIDI.

== Career ==
Smith was born on April 2, 1950, in San Francisco. He had a music background from playing piano at home and in bands at college, and had degrees in both Computer Science and Electronic Engineering from UC Berkeley.

=== Sequential Circuits and Prophet-5 ===
He purchased a Minimoog in 1972 and later built his own analog sequencer, founding Sequential Circuits in 1974 and advertising his product for sale in Rolling Stone. By 1977 he was working at Sequential full-time, and later that year he designed the Prophet-5, the world's first microprocessor-based musical instrument and also the first programmable polyphonic synth, an innovation that marked a crucial step forward in synthesizer design and functionality. Sequential went on to become one of the most successful music synthesizer manufacturers of the time.

=== MIDI ===
In 1981 Smith set out to create a standard protocol for communication between electronic musical instruments from different manufacturers worldwide. Dave Smith and Chet Wood presented a paper outlining the idea of a Universal Synthesizer Interface (USI) to the Audio Engineering Society (AES) in 1981, after meetings with Tom Oberheim and Roland founder Ikutaro Kakehashi. After some enhancements and revisions, the new standard was introduced as "Musical Instrument Digital Interface" (MIDI) at the Winter NAMM Show in 1983, when a Sequential Circuits Prophet-600 was successfully connected to a Roland Jupiter-6. In 1987 he was named a Fellow of the AES for his continuing work in the area of music synthesis.

In 2005, Smith was inducted into the Mix Foundation TECnology (Technical Excellence and Creativity) Hall of Fame for the MIDI specification. In 2013, he and the Japanese businessman Ikutaro Kakehashi, the president of Roland Corporation, received a Technical Grammy Award for their contributions to the development of MIDI. In 2022, the Guardian wrote that MIDI remained as important to music as USB was to computing, and represented "a crucial value system of cooperation and mutual benefit, one all but thrown out by today's major tech companies in favour of captive markets". As of 2022, Smith's original MIDI design was still in use.

=== Yamaha, Korg and Seer ===
After Sequential, Smith was President of DSD, Inc, a Research and Development Division of Yamaha, where he worked on physical modeling synthesis and software synthesizer concepts. In May 1989 he started the Korg R&D group in California, which went on to produce the innovative and commercially successful Wavestation synthesizer and other technology.

Smith became president at Seer Systems and developed the world's first software-based synthesizer running on a PC. This synth, commissioned by Intel, was demonstrated by Andy Grove in a Comdex keynote speech in 1994. The second generation of this software synthesizer sold over 10 million copies, as a result of being licensed to Creative Labs in 1996; it was responsible for 32 of the 64 voices in Creative Labs' AWE 64 line of soundcards.

The third generation of Smith's software synthesizer, renamed Reality, was released in 1997. Smith was both the lead engineer on Reality, and wrote all the low-level optimized floating point synthesis code. Reality was the recipient of a 1998 Editors' Choice Award, and earned Electronic Musician Magazine's highest possible rating.

=== Dave Smith Instruments and return to Sequential ===
In 2002, Smith launched Dave Smith Instruments, a manufacturer of electronic musical instruments. In 2015, Smith regained the rights to the Sequential name from Yamaha, and released the Prophet-6 under that name. Dave Smith Instruments rebranded as Sequential in 2018.

== Personal life ==
Smith was born in San Francisco, California, to Peter B. Smith and Lucretia Papagni Smith. His father was also a San Francisco native. His mother's family came from Italian grape growers and winemakers who had immigrated to Fresno. He had five siblings. Smith's father died in 1972, and his mother died in 2021.

After college studies in Berkeley, Smith lived and worked in San Jose in the 1970s. He was physically active, competing in the Ironman World Championship in Hawaii, and hiking tall mountains with his friend Roger Linn—another synth pioneer. Smith married Denise White, and in 1988 they moved to St. Helena, California. They had two children, Haley and Campbell. Smith died of a heart attack on May 31, 2022, at the age of 72, in Detroit, Michigan, where he was attending the Movement electronic festival.

== Awards ==
- 2015: SEAMUS Award
- January 2013: Technical Grammy (along with Ikutaro Kakehashi) for the creation of MIDI.
- September 2012: Keyboard Magazine Hall of Fame
- September 2005: Induction into the TECnology (Technical Excellence and Creativity) Hall of Fame at the AES show by Mix Foundation.
- October 1987: Received Audio Engineering Society (AES) Fellowship Award, for having made a valuable contribution to the advancement in or dissemination of knowledge of audio engineering or in the promotion of its application in practice.

== Interviews ==
- Dave Smith Interview at NAMM Oral History Collection, Jan 2005
- "Dave Smith In His Own Words", Francis Preve, Keyboard Magazine, Jul 2012
- Dave Smith: Sequential Circuits, Korg, Yamaha, soft synths, and his new Evolver synths., Gearwire.com, 2006
- Dave Smith: The father of MIDI Mac Music, Oct 2003
- Interview With Dave Smith KVR
- Episode 20 : Music Tech Pioneers III : Sequential Circuits : Rise, Fall, Return! DAWbench Radioshow, May 2022
