= Sequential (company) =

American synthesizer company

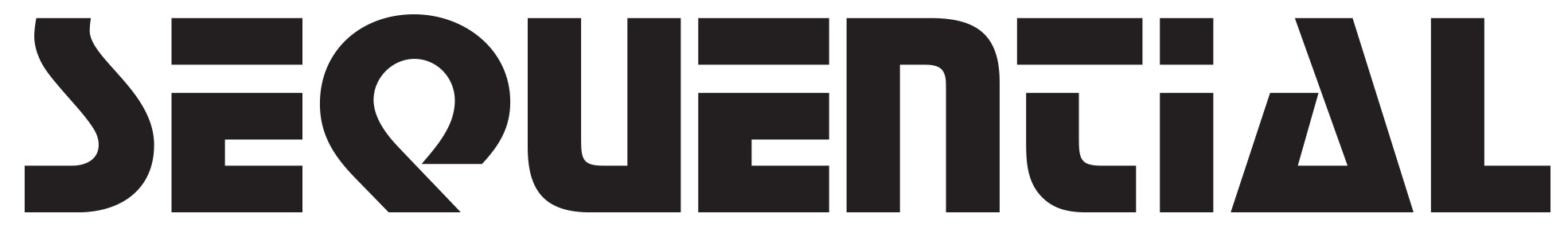
- Formerly: Sequential Circuits; Dave Smith Instruments
- Founded: 1974; 52 years ago
- Headquarters: 1527 Stockton Street; San Francisco, California, U.S.
- Key people: Dave Smith (founder)
- Products: Synthesizers
- Brands: Prophet
- Parent: Focusrite
- Website: sequential.com

Sequential is an American synthesizer company founded in 1974 as Sequential Circuits by Dave Smith. In 1978, Sequential released the Prophet-5, the first programmable polyphonic synthesizer, which was widely used in the music industry. In the 1980s, Sequential was important in the development of MIDI, a technical standard for synchronizing electronic instruments.

In 1987, Sequential went out of business and was purchased by Yamaha. Smith continued to develop instruments through a new company, Dave Smith Instruments. In 2015, Yamaha returned the Sequential Circuits trademark to Dave Smith Instruments, which rebranded as Sequential in 2018. In 2021, Sequential was acquired by the British audio technology company Focusrite. Smith died in 2022.

== History ==
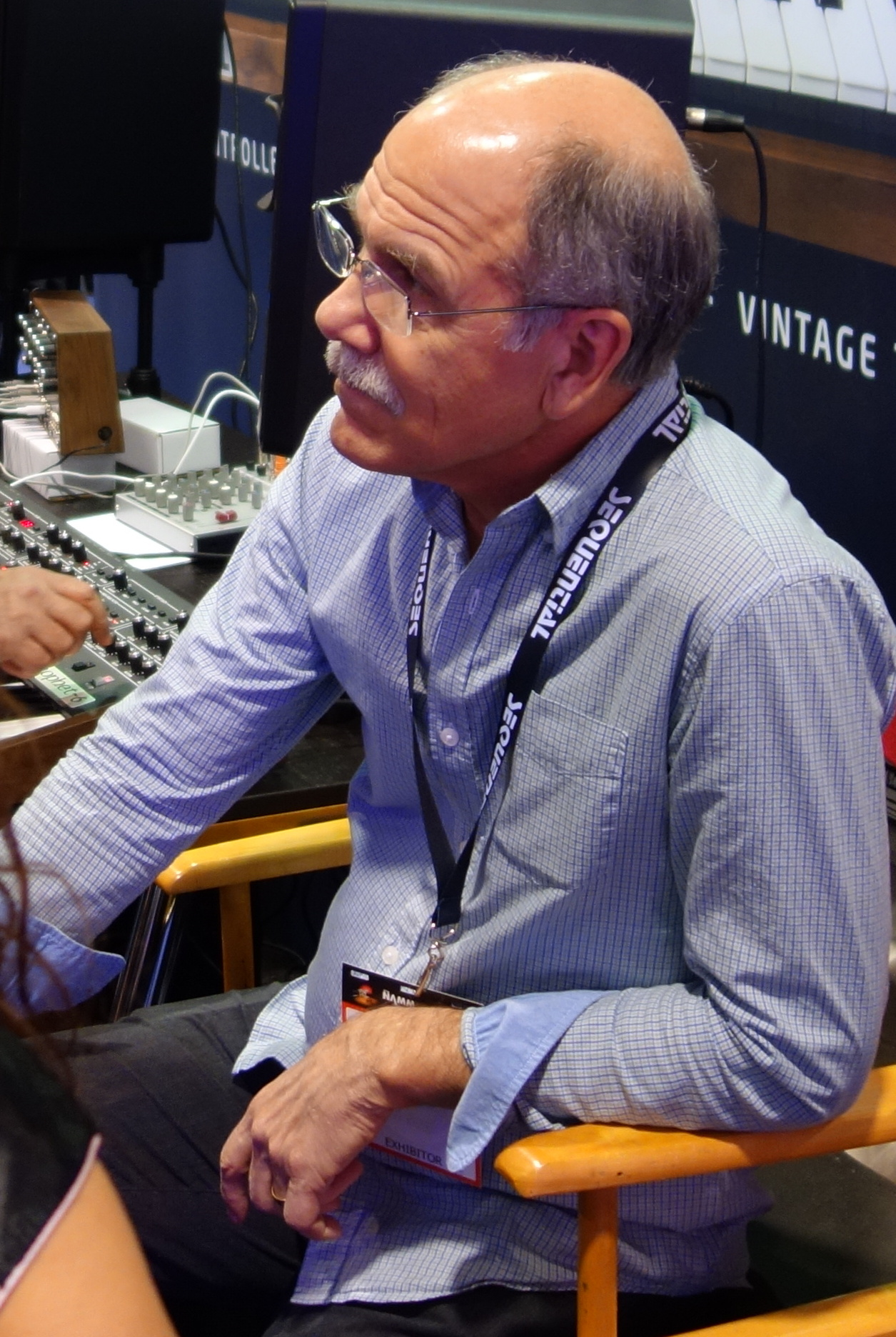
Sequential founder Dave Smith in 2015

=== 1974–1980: Founding, first products and Prophet-5 ===
The engineer Dave Smith founded Sequential Circuits in San Francisco in 1974. The first Sequential Circuits product was an analog sequencer for use with Moog and ARP synthesizers, followed by a digital sequencer and the Model 700 Programmer, which allowed users to program Minimoog and ARP 2600 synthesizers. The Model 800, launched in 1975, was controlled and programmed with a microprocessor.

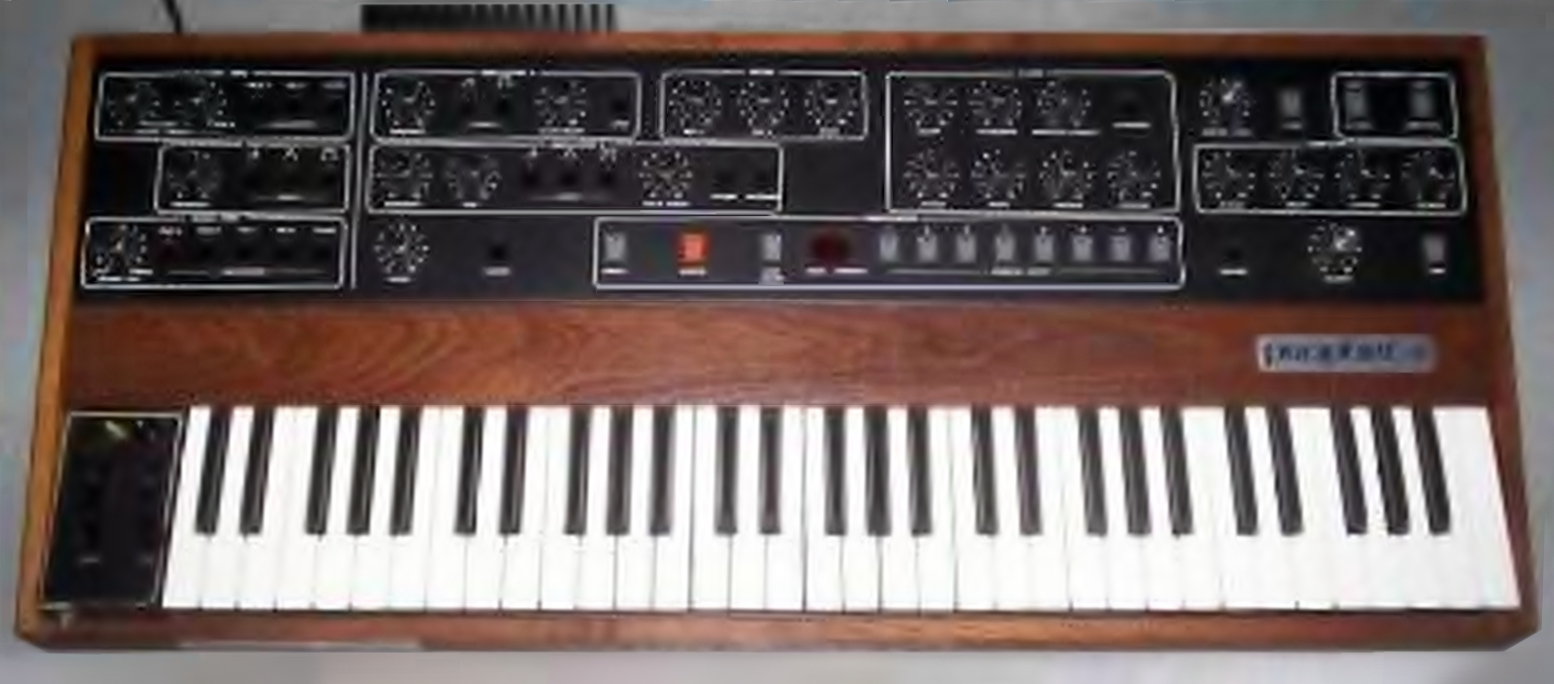
The Prophet-5 (1978), the first Sequential synthesizer. The specific model pictured above is the "Rev 3", first released in 1980.

At the time, Smith had a full-time job working with microprocessors, then a new technology. He conceived the idea of combining them with synthesizer chips to create a programmable synthesizer, but did not pursue the idea, assuming Moog or ARP would design the instrument first. When no instrument emerged, in early 1977, Smith quit his job to work full-time on a design for the Prophet-5, the first fully programmable polyphonic synthesizer. He demonstrated it at the NAMM International Music & Sound Expo in January 1978 and shipped the first models later that year.

Whereas previous synthesizers required users to adjust cables and knobs to change sounds, with no guarantee of exactly recreating a sound, the Prophet-5 used microprocessors to store sounds in patch memory. This facilitated a move from synthesizers creating unpredictable sounds to producing "a standard package of familiar sounds". The Prophet-5 became a market leader and industry standard, used by musicians such as Michael Jackson, Madonna, and Dr Dre, and by film composers such as John Carpenter. It was followed by the larger Prophet-10, which featured two keybeds and was less successful as it was notorious for unreliability. The smaller Pro-One, essentially a monophonic Prophet-5, saw more success.

=== 1981–1982: MIDI ===
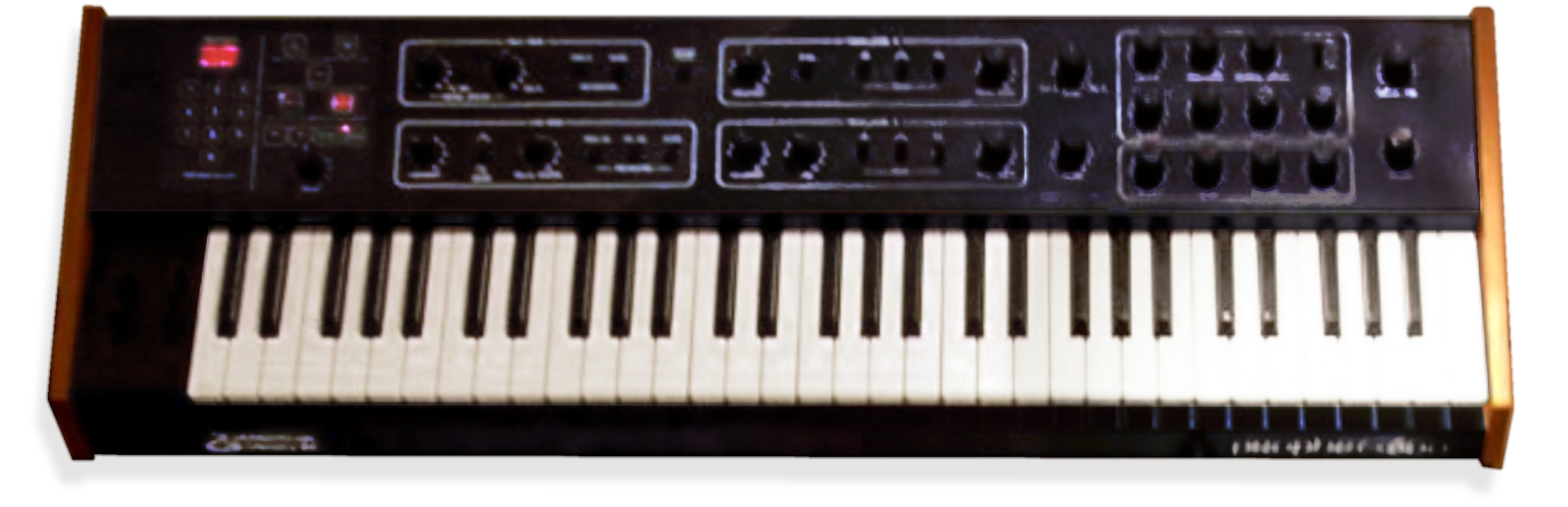
Prophet 600 (1982), the first Sequential Circuits synthesizer with MIDI functionality

In 1981, Ikutaro Kakehashi, the founder of the Japanese synthesizer company Roland, contacted Smith about creating a standardized means of synchronizing electronic instruments manufactured by different companies. Smith and the Sequential engineer Chet Wood designed an interface using Roland's Digital Control Bus (DCB) as a basis. This standard was discussed and modified by representatives of Roland, Yamaha, Korg, and Kawai. The protocol was named Musical Instrument Digital Interface (MIDI) and unveiled by Kakehashi and Smith, who received Technical Grammy Awards in 2013 for their work. In 1982, Sequential released the Prophet 600, one of the first MIDI-equipped synthesizers. In 1984, they released the Drumtraks, one of the first drum machines with MIDI control.

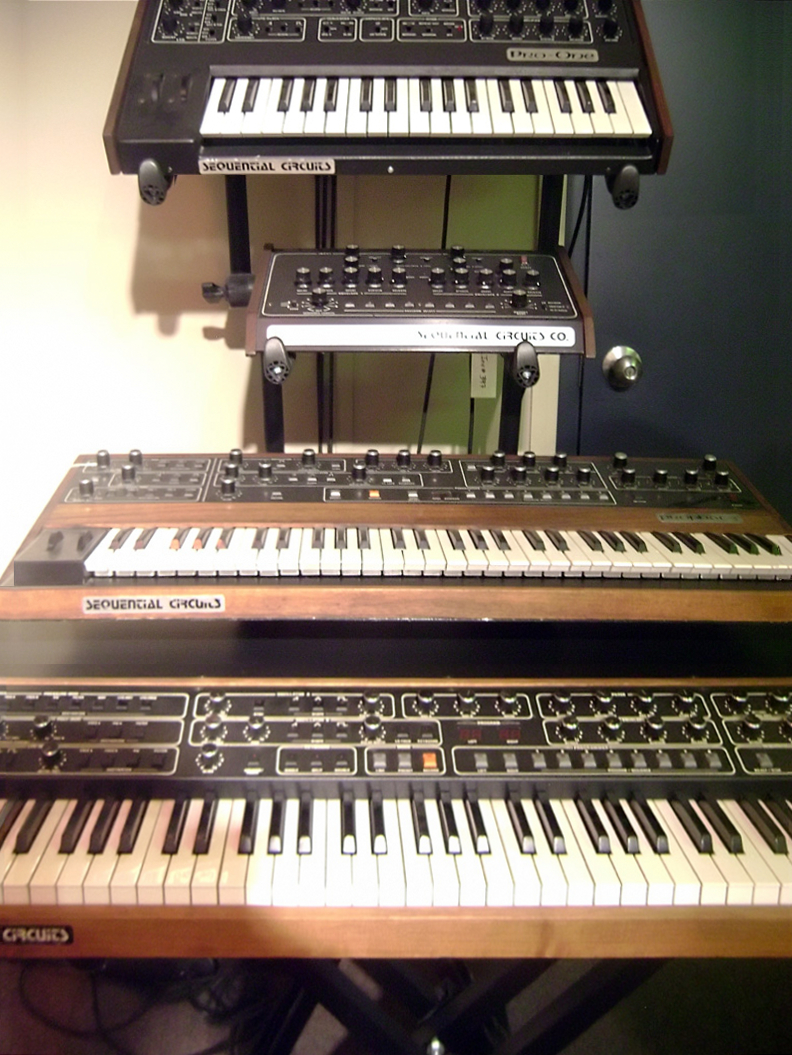
Various Sequential products [top to bottom]: PRO-ONE (1981); Model 700 Programmer (1976); Prophet-5 (1978); Prophet T8 (1983)

=== 1987: Closure ===
In 1987 Sequential Circuits released their final product, the Prophet 3000 digital sampler. Only several dozen units were produced before the company went out of business. Smith blamed the closure on the decision to move to computer audio in prior years: "We were too small and under-capitalized, and we were a few years too early in the market ... It drained our resources, so by the time we pulled back to professional instruments, it was too late."

Sequential Circuits was purchased by the Japanese corporation Yamaha. They released no products under the Sequential name and shut it down in 1989, following the failure of the TX16W digital sampler. Smith and much of the development team moved to Korg, where they worked mainly on the Wavestation synthesizer.

=== 2002–2014: Dave Smith Instruments ===
In 2002, after several years of working on software synthesis, Smith opened a new company, Dave Smith Instruments, to build new hardware. Its first product was the Evolver synthesizer in 2002. In 2008, Dave Smith Instruments launched the Prophet '08, conceived as an affordable eight-voice analog synthesizer.

=== 2015–present: Return to Sequential and Focusrite acquisition ===
In January 2015, Yamaha returned the Sequential Circuits brands to Smith in a goodwill gesture. This was at the encouragement of Kakehashi, who had worked with Smith to create MIDI. Kakehashi said: "I feel that it's important to get rid of unnecessary conflict among electronic musical instrument companies. That is exactly the spirit of MIDI. For this reason, I personally recommended that the President of Yamaha, Mr. Nakata, return the rights to the Sequential name to Dave Smith."

In 2015, Sequential released the Prophet-6, followed in 2018 by the Prophet-X, which featured sample playback and digitally controlled oscillators. On August 31, 2018, the 40th anniversary of the Prophet-5, Dave Smith Instruments rebranded as Sequential. In September 2020, Sequential announced an updated reissue of the original Prophet-5. Sequential reported revenues of $18.3 million in 2020. In April 2021, Sequential was acquired by the British audio technology company Focusrite. Smith died on May 31, 2022.
