= Software synthesizer =

Software that generates audio

A software synthesizer or virtual instrument is a software app or plug-in that generates digital audio, usually for music. Virtual instruments can be played in real time via a MIDI controller, or may be readily interfaced with other music software such as music sequencers typically in the context of digital audio workstation (DAW) software. Virtual instruments exist for essentially every musical instrument type, emulating various types of synthesis, orchestral instruments, drums, guitars, pianos, and even recreations of specific models of hardware synthesizers and classic keyboards.

Mainstream virtual instruments were first introduced in the late 1990s, and popularized by Steinberg's introduction of VST instruments in 1999. As computer processing power increased into the early 2000s, virtual instruments could produce what previously required the dedicated hardware of a conventional synthesizer or sampler. By 2014, virtual instruments had become the second-largest music software product category in terms of revenue, with the first being DAW software.

== Background ==
In 1957, while working at Bell Labs, Max Mathews wrote MUSIC, the first widely accepted program for making music (in actuality, sound) on a digital computer. Barry Vercoe followed Mathews' work with Music 11, and went on to develop the audio programming language Csound at the MIT Media Lab in 1985.

In 1986, Aegis released Sonix for the Amiga. Alongside a graphical score editor, Sonix leveraged the Amiga's Paula sound chip for a 4-voice software synthesizer. It featured MIDI input, a recognizable user interface, waveform drawing, an envelope, LFO, and non-resonant filter - calculating the synthesized result in real-time and sending it out, polyphonically, to the Amiga's 4 PCM-based channels. In 1988, Digidesign Turbosynth software enabled users to patch together digital signal processing modules with functionality ranging from various forms of synthesis, to filters and a variety of modifiers. The sound produced by the software modules could be exported as samples to be played on a hardware sampler.

== History ==
In 1994, Seer Systems, under the direction of Sequential founder Dave Smith, demonstrated the first software-based synthesizer running on PC. The second generation of this software synthesizer was licensed to Creative Labs in 1996 for use in their AWE 64 line of soundcards. The third generation, renamed Reality, was released in 1997, and was one of the first commercial software synthesizers. Reality combined various forms of synthesis, including subtractive, additive, PCM, wavetable, FM, and physical modeling, with multi-mode filters, LFOs, and envelopes.

In 1997, Propellerhead Software released ReBirth RB-338, which emulated classic Roland instruments commonly associated with techno: two TB-303 Bass Line synthesizers and a TR-808. A TR-909 drum machine was added in version 2.0. Also in 1997, NemeSys introduced GigaSampler, the first software sample player that could stream samples in real time directly from a hard drive. The same year, Native Instruments (whose name itself referred to software-based instruments) was founded with the Generator modular synthesizer software. Two years later, Generator would be superseded by Reaktor.

In 1999, when Steinberg released Cubase VST 3.7, they updated the VST standard introduced in 1996 to support VST instruments (VSTi), allowing users to run software instruments (including synthesizers) as plug-ins, and releasing the first VSTi, Neon. This helped integrate software synthesizers into DAW software, streamlining usage and triggering a wave of new software instruments. As computers became more powerful, software synthesizers did as well. This led to developments in new forms of synthesis such as granular synthesis. By the early 2000s, several software samplers, such as Emagic's EXS24, Steinberg's HALion, and Native Instruments' Kontakt were available, and shortly thereafter emerged a trend of companies that specialized in sample libraries developing their own sample-based virtual instruments, Software synthesizers utilized sample playback and even physical modelling to imitate instruments ranging from acoustic pianos, drums and percussion, stringed and wind instruments, to electromechanical instruments such as tonewheel organs and electric pianos.

== Types ==
Steinberg HALion Sonic SE sample player (top left), Groove Agent ONE drum sample player (top center), and Software effect processors (bottom) in Cubase 6

Virtual instruments exist for essentially every musical instrument type, emulating various types of synthesis, orchestral instruments, drums, guitars, pianos, and even recreations of specific models of hardware synthesizers and classic keyboards. Alternately, many virtual instruments are unique.

Software synthesizers represent the full range of synthesis methods, including subtractive synthesis (including analog modeling, a subtype), FM synthesis (including the similar phase distortion synthesis), physical modelling synthesis, additive synthesis (including the related resynthesis), and sample-based synthesis.

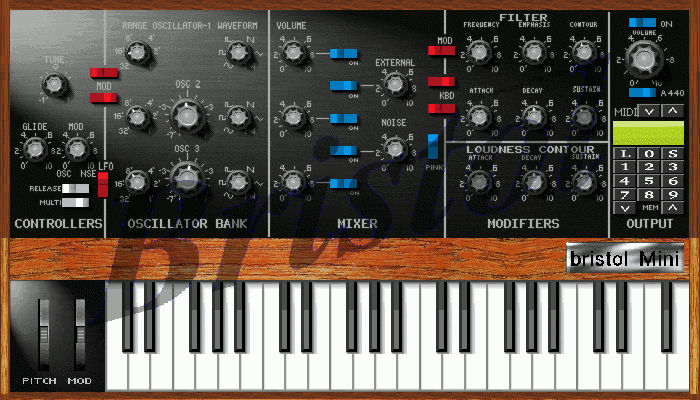
Bristol Mini emulation of the Moog Minimoog

Many popular hardware synthesizers are no longer manufactured but have been emulated in software, with the emulation often having a GUI that models the appearance of the original hardware and even the exact placements of the original hardware controls. Some emulations (sometimes referred to as software clones) can even import sound patches for the original hardware synthesizer and produce sounds nearly indistinguishable from the original. Many of these emulations have additional functionality not available on the original hardware versions. Popular synthesizers such as the Moog Minimoog, Yamaha CS-80 and DX7, ARP 2600 and Odyssey, Sequential Circuits Prophet-5, Oberheim OB-X, Roland Jupiter and Juno Series, Korg M1, and dozens of other classics have been recreated in software, with some versions officially endorsed by or even released by the original manufacturer.

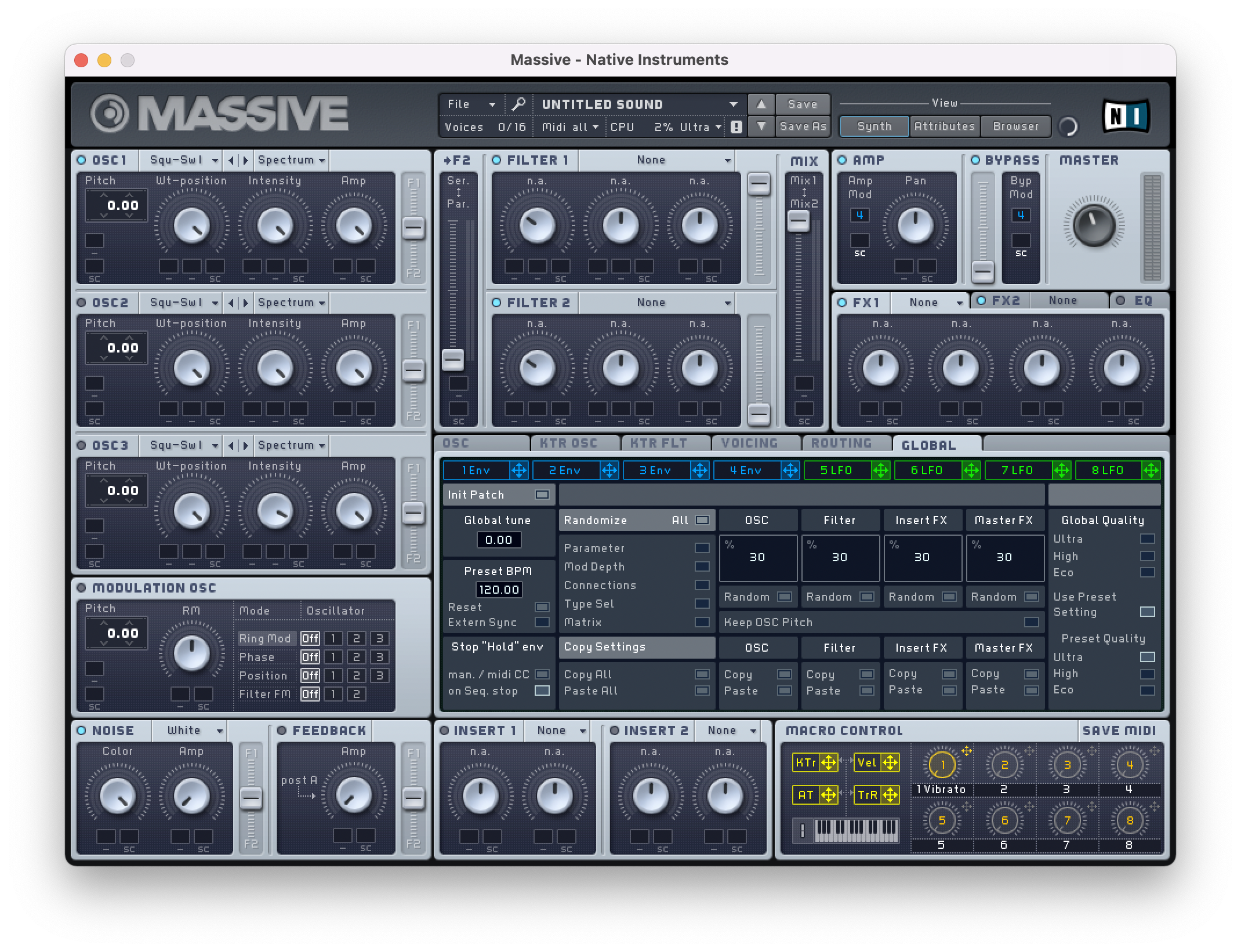
Native Instruments Massive wavetable synth

There is also a variety of popular software synthesizers that are exclusively software and not emulations of hardware synthesizers. Examples include Spectrasonics' Omnisphere, Native Instruments Massive, Future Audio Workshop's Circle, Xfer's Serum, Vital Audio's Vital, Arturia's Pigments, u-he's Zebra, and even the Alchemy synth integrated in Logic Pro, which developed from the original Camel Audio version after that developer was acquired by Apple.

Specific models of classic keyboards, such as the Hammond B-3 organ, Rhodes and Wurlitzer electronic pianos, Mellotron, and others have been recreated as virtual instruments. These software recreations recreate the sounds and functionality of the original instruments, while being more readily available, less expensive to acquire and maintain, and often having additional features the originals did not.

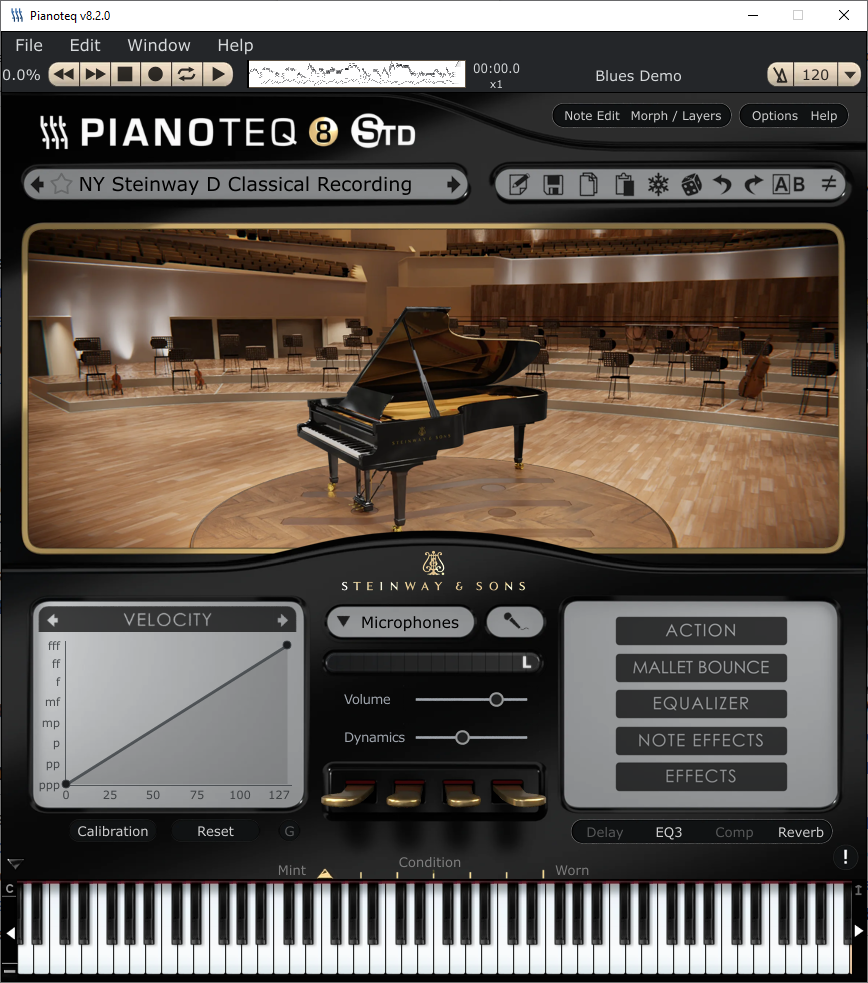
Applied Acoustics Pianoteq physical modeled grand piano

Sampled pianos and piano emulations are also a popular virtual instrument category, with several examples sampling specific models by Steinway, Yamaha, Bösendorfer, Fazioli, C. Bechstein, Blüthner, and others. Some piano VIs even sample a specific piano, such as Abbey Road Studios' "Mrs Mills Piano," the piano at Château d'Hérouville studio, and even the pianos personally owned by Alicia Keys and Hans Zimmer.

Another popular virtual instrument category is drums, with many drum VIs available. Some of these companies offer numerous expansion libraries for their drum VIs that allow users to add additional drum kits and drum patterns, often times played by such notable drummers as Roger Taylor, Chad Smith, Clyde Stubblefield, and John Tempesta, and recorded by such notable engineers as Hugh Padgham, Al Schmitt, Steve Albini, and Eddie Kramer, in such recording studios as Capitol, AIR, Sunset Sound, Real World, Rockfield Studios, and others.

Companies including EastWest, Vienna Symphonic Library, Spitfire Audio have released extensive and detailed VIs focused on orchestral instrumentation, partnering with composers like Hans Zimmer, orchestras such as the BBC Symphony Orchestra, and utilizing recording spaces such as Abbey Road Studios, EastWest Studios and Maida Vale Studios.

Also of note is software like Csound, Nyquist, and Max (software), which can be used to program software instruments.

== Comparison to hardware synthesizers ==
Softsynths suffer their own issues compared to traditional hardware. Softsynths tend to have more latency than hardware; hardware synths also offer more stability. This is why oftentimes a composer or virtual conductor will want a "draft mode" for initial score editing and then use the "production mode" to generate high-quality sound as one gets closer to the final version. Hardware synths also have dedicated controls and audio outputs, where softsynths rely on a separate MIDI controller and audio interface, as well as the computer itself required to run the VI software application.

Softsynths have the advantage of lower manufacturing and shipping costs, making them less expensive than hardware synths. They can also benefit from the processing power of the computer they're running on. Computer memory capacity allows for much larger sample libraries, offering enhanced velocity layering, and "round robin" sampling (a random, different sample per struck note), among other techniques. Software GUIs benefit from more space and flexibility for complex synthesis and complex routing techniques. Finally, software integrates very well with DAWs, for easier parameter automation and instant patch recall that saves sound settings and automations with a project.

== Notable virtual instrument companies ==
- Arturia
- Audio Modeling
- EastWest
- Future Audio Workshop
- GForce
- IK Multimedia
- Image-Line
- Native Instruments
- Roland
- Spectrasonics
- Spitfire Audio
- Steinberg
- Toontrack
- u-he
- UVI
- Vienna Symphonic Library
- Xfer Records
- XLN Audio

== See also ==
- Digital audio editor
- Modular synthesizer
- Music sequencer
- Sound module
- Synthesizer
- SynthFont
- TiMidity++
- List of music software
- Category:Software synthesizers
- Category:Music software plugin architectures
