= Korg M3 =

Music workstation

M3
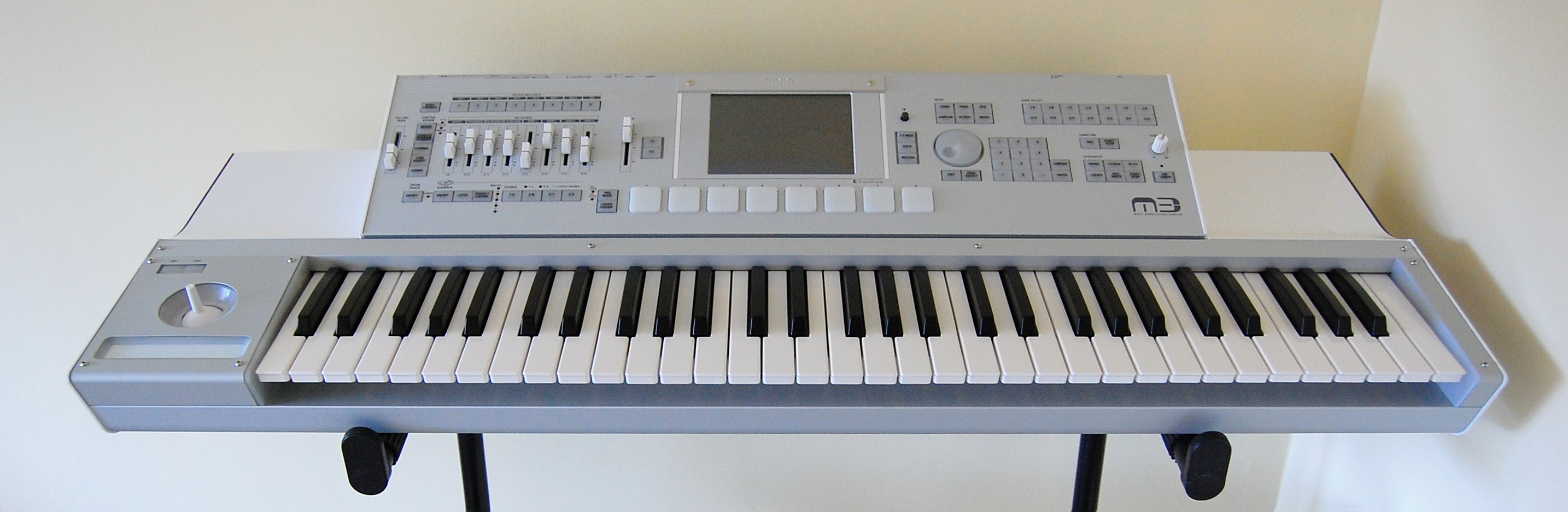
- Korg M3
- Manufacturer: Korg
- Dates: 2007 - 2013
- Price: M3M (module): US$2375; M3 61-key: US$3000; M3 73-key: US$3475; M3 88-key: US$4000

Technical specifications
- Polyphony: 120 voice - single mode 60 voice - double mode
- Oscillator: 120 oscillators - single mode 120 oscillators - double mode
- Synthesis type: PCM Sampler; Enhanced Definition Synthesis; Optional - EXB-Radias
- Filter: Dual Multimode
- Aftertouch expression: Yes
- Velocity expression: Yes
- Storage memory: 64 Mb - Expandable to 320 Mb with optional EXB-M256
- Effects: 3-band EQ (up to 16); 5 insert effects 2 master effects 1 total effect

Input/output
- Keyboard: 61-key, Velocity Aftertouch; 73-key, Velocity Aftertouch; 88-key Hammer Action, Velocity Aftertouch none - ( M3 Module)
- Left-hand control: 8× Sliders; 8× Switches; Joystick; Ribbon Controller; 8× Velocity Sensitive Pads; X-Y Touchscreen Control
- External control: MIDI; USB 2.0

Korg M3 is a music workstation synthesizer manufactured by Korg Corporation and introduced at the NAMM Show in January 2007, being released four months later. The M3 is the successor of the famous Triton series. The name is based on the former M1, which was considered a revolutionary synth at the time (and is not to be confused with Korg M3R rack mount unit of 1989, which was a cost-reduced version of the M1R rack unit).

The hardware synthesizer chip was designed around the HD-1, one of the various engines in the Korg OASYS. The M3 was named keyboard of the year at the Musik Messe Awards in Germany in early 2007.

== Firmware ==
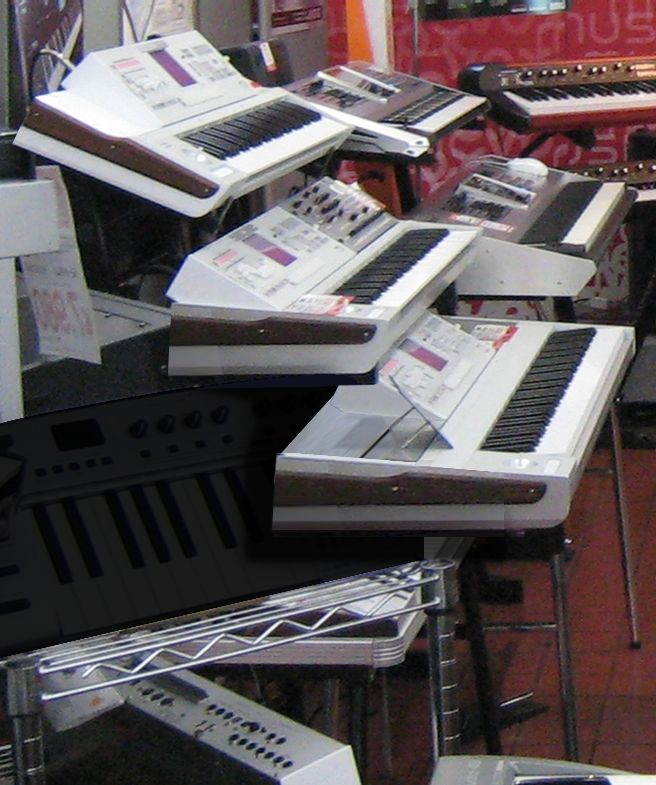
Korg M3 (61 / 73 / 88 key)

At the end of Q3 2008, Korg released a major update to the M3's operating system, which changes the unit to the 'M3 XPanded'. This update refines many of the functions of the M3, makes minor changes to the graphic user interface, adds four additional PCM sample libraries including a grand piano (EX-USB-PCM03) library, two brass and woodwind libraries (EX-USB-PCM01 & EX-USB-PCM02), a stereo grand piano (EX-USB-PCM04) library, and updates the KARMA to version 2.2 Kay Algorithmic Realtime Music Architecture developed by Stephen Kay (see: Korg KARMA).

== Korg Komponent System ==
Korg Komponent System is a unique modular keyboard system devised by Korg that allows the keyboardist to configure their M3 in a multitude of ways. With three different keyboard options Korg explains the system like this:

The 61-key model lets you mount a RADIAS-R analog modeling synthesizer instead of the M3-M sound generator, the 73-key model lets you mount the M3-M together with a RADIAS-R analog modeling synthesizer, and the 88-key model supports the combination of M3-M and RADIAS-R or even mounting two M3-M units simultaneously. Of course you can detach the M3-M sound generator and use it as a sound module, giving you great flexibility for constructing the system you need whenever you want.

== Korg M50 ==
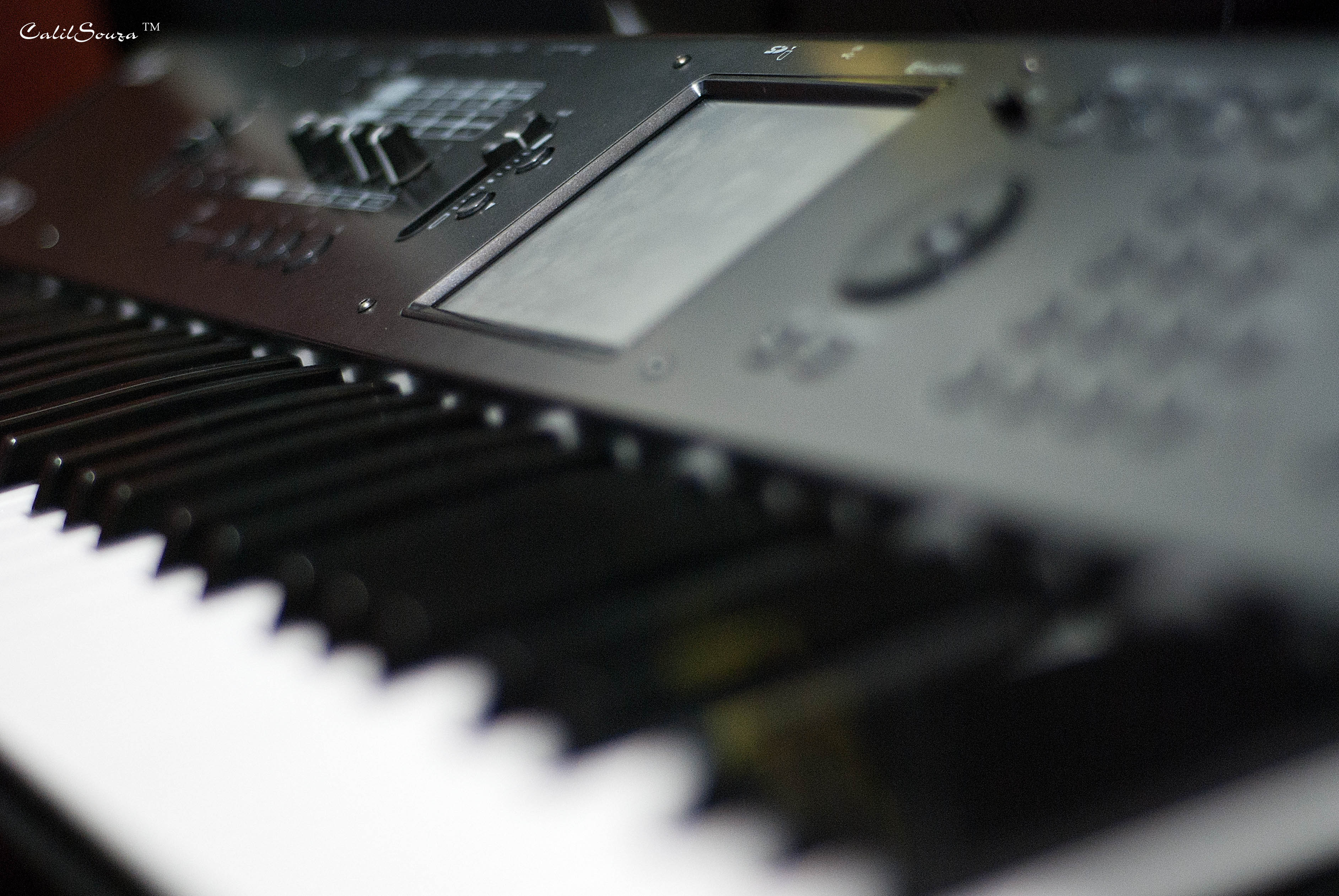
Korg M50

In 2008, Korg unveiled a new, stripped-down version of the M3: the Korg M50. It runs on the same EDS sound system as the M3, but it has less polyphony, no support for expansion cards, and no sampling capabilities. The Korg M50 also lacks a Karma engine, but it can still be used if bought separately and installed on a computer. The 88-key version, which featured the RH3 graded hammer-action piano keys, is the lightest 88-key keyboard Korg has ever made.

== See also ==
- Korg Kronos
- Korg Trinity
- Korg Triton
- Korg Karma
- Korg RADIAS
- Alesis Fusion
- Roland Fantom-X
- Roland Juno-G
- Sampler (musical instrument)
