= Yamaha EX5 =

Synthesizer made by the Yamaha Corporation

EX5
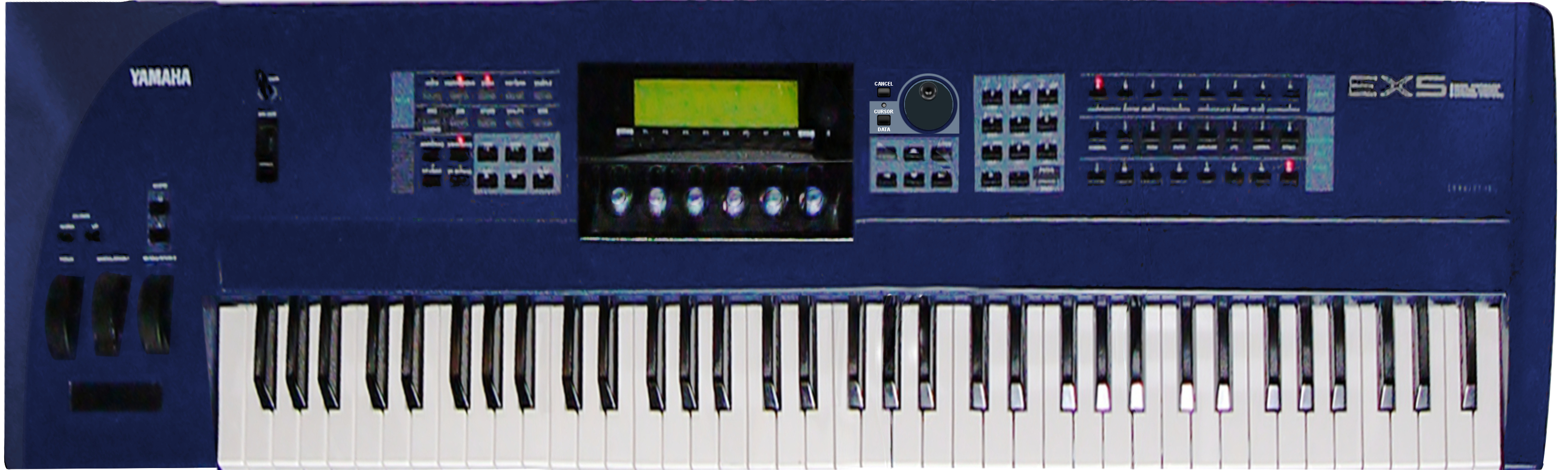
- Manufacturer: Yamaha Corporation
- Dates: 1998 - 2001

Technical specifications
- Polyphony: 128 AWM2-oscillators in max 128-voices, max 2 AN-voices, max 1 VL-voice, max 16 FDSP-voices,
- Timbrality: AWM2-only 16, AN/VL/FDSP monotimbral
- Synthesis type: AWM2, AN, VL, FDSP, Sampling
- Aftertouch expression: Yes
- Velocity expression: Yes
- Storage memory: 512 preset 256 user 128 Performances
- Effects: Reverb, chorus and Insertion

Input/output
- Keyboard: 76 keys
- External control: MIDI (In × 2, Out × 2, Thru)

The Yamaha EX5 is a synthesizer/workstation produced by Yamaha from 1998 to 2000. The EX5 combines several methods of sound generation (see below). The later released EX7 was a cheaper version of the EX5 with fewer keys, polyphony, sounds and functions. The Yamaha EX music synthesizers, along with the early Yamaha S series, were the predecessors of the Motif workstation series.

== Features ==
The Yamaha EX5 (EX stands for Extended Synthesis) uses four different tone generators for generating sounds. These are AWM2 ("Advanced Wave Memory, 2nd Generation" PCM-subtractive), AN (Analog Physical Modeling), FDSP (Formulated Digital Sound Processing) and VL (Virtual Acoustic) synthesis. The fifth sound source is [user-RAM/flashROM [Sample-based synthesis]].

Sound patches ("Voices") can be assembled from either a maximum of four AWM2 oscillators ("Elements"), or a combination variously fewer AWM2 Elements with two AN Elements (either layered or duophonically), or one monophonic VL Element, or one AN Element with three FDSP/AWM2 Elements.

Non-AWM2-only Voice types are monotimbral, as only one patch incorporating AN, VL, or FDSP may be used in a multitimbral setup ("Performance"), which also reduces insert effects to one (from four), and all other Performance Voices must be AWM2-only.

The EX5 has extensive sampling capabilities. Samples can be used in AWM sounds, or assigned to individual keys on the keyboard and saved to floppy disk or an external storage device. The sample memory is 1MB, and this can be expanded to 65MB with volatile SIMM memory. Non-volatile Flash Memory can be installed to allow samples to be retained between power cycles. Flash memory capacity can be either 4MB or 8MB. (Beginning in the 2010s, aftermarket flashROM up to 16MB became sporadically available.) An optional SCSI interface was available to connect external mass storage drives for samples (and other user data).

EX5 has a built-in 16-track sequencer, and a 4-track arpeggiator with 50 preset patterns.

There was a limited edition released at the end of production, Yamaha EX5S (also known as the "Millennium Edition"). This model came in a silver casing and is only distributed for the Asian market. Only 500 units were produced.

== EX5R ==
The EX5 was also released as a rack-mountable sound module. The EX5R had all the functions of the EX5, only missing the keyboard.

== See also ==
- Synthesizer
- Music workstation
