= Korg Triton =

Workstation synthesizer

The Korg Triton is a music workstation synthesizer, featuring digital sampling and sequencing, released in 1999. It uses Korg's "HI (Hyper Integrated) Synthesis" system and was eventually available in several model variants with numerous upgrade options. The Triton became renowned as a benchmark of keyboard technology, and has been widely featured in music videos and live concerts. At the NAMM Show in 2007, Korg announced the Korg M3 as its successor.

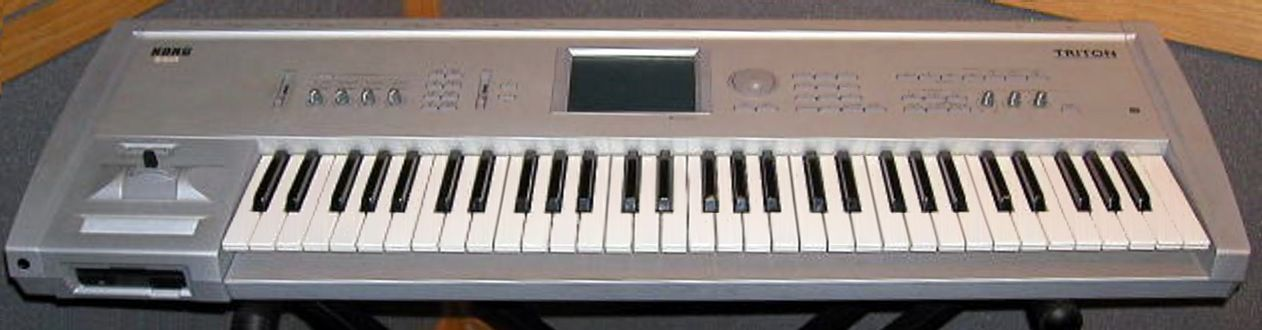
Korg Triton Classic

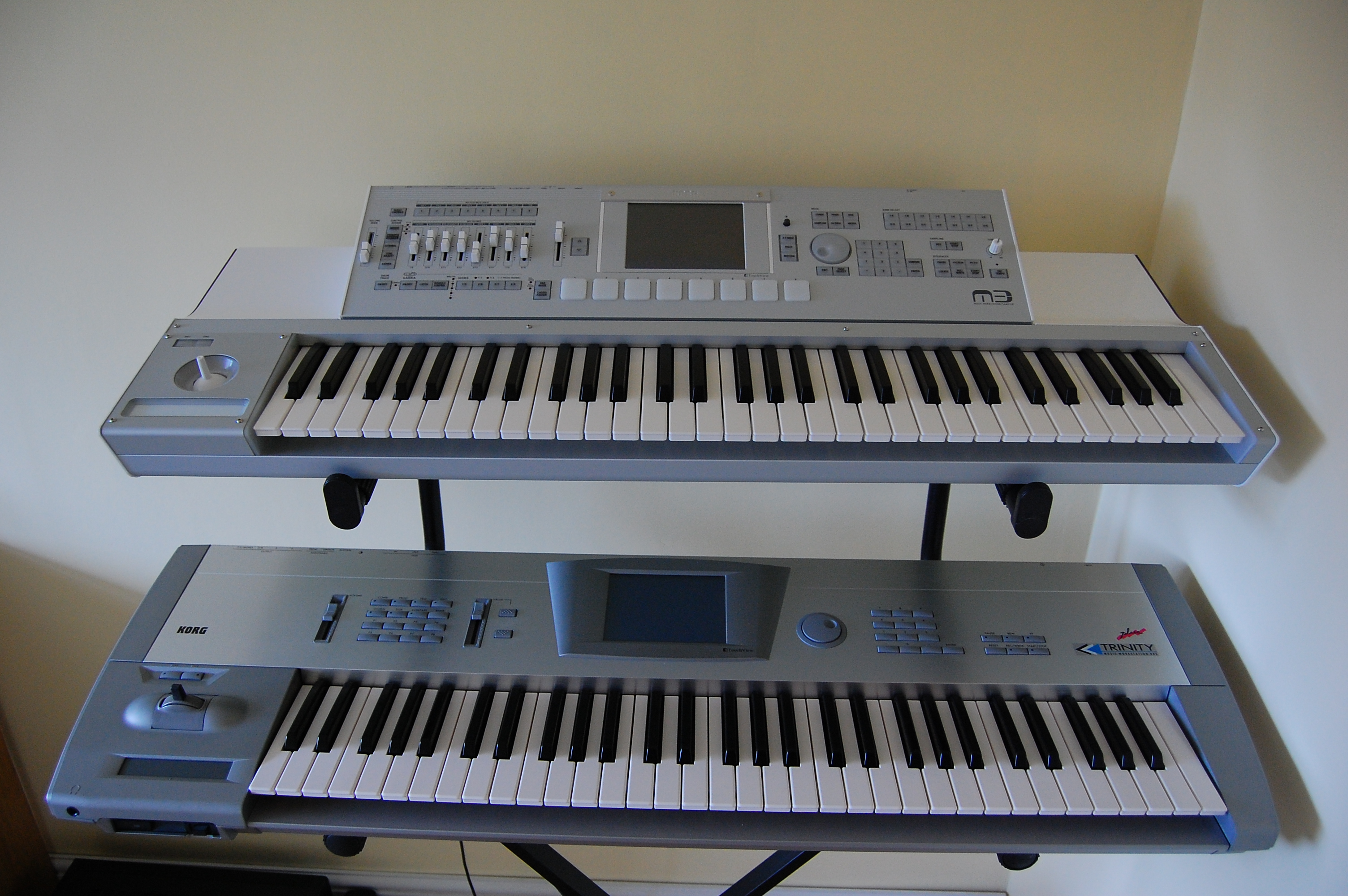
Successor, Korg M3 and predecessor, Korg Trinity

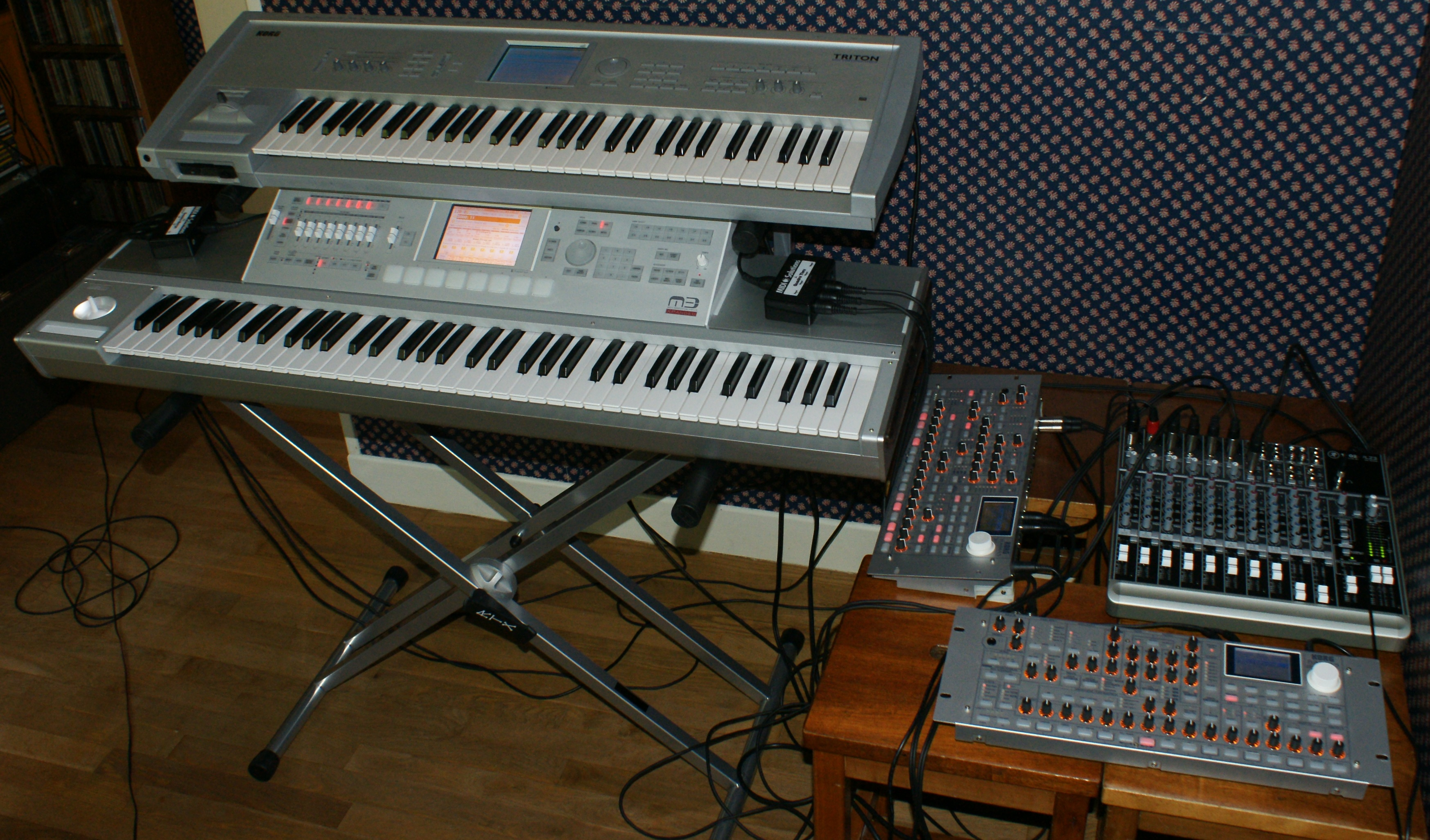
KORG M3, KORG Triton, 2 KORG Radias-R and Mackie 1402 VLZ3, with MIDI Merge and Thru boxes sitting on the M3 (left and right respectively)

== History and pedigree ==
The Korg Triton line is considered the direct descendant of the earlier Korg Trinity line of workstations. The two ranges are aesthetically and functionally very similar. The Triton "Classic" followed the Trinity's naming conventions of the Pro and Pro X being designated to models featuring 76 and 88 keys respectively (that naming system actually started with previous 01/w series, also available with 61 keys (base and -FD models), 76 (01/wPro) and 88 (01/wProX).

The original Triton introduced many improvements over the Trinity, like 62-note polyphony, dual polyphonic arpeggiators, RPPR phrase recorder, onboard sampler with expandable RAM, greatly improved effects & routing possibilities (including the processing of external signals via the internal effects), larger synthesis modulation matrix, programmable LFO routing, faster operating system, significantly faster touchscreen response, sample ROM expandability, enhanced UI including category search (ability to browse through related groups of sounds like pianos, brass, strings, etc.), additional audio output jacks, redesigned sequencer adding individual track looping and Cue List and significantly more event memory, more than doubled Program/Combination memory slots, more realtime controllers including knobs, portamento, and availability of multi-timbral MOSS synthesis expansion (whereas Trinity's MOSS expansion was mono-timbral). In addition, the Triton US MSRP was $900 less than the basic Trinity.

The biggest improvement of Triton was in the sound: new multisamples and better processing, combined with full availability of all five insert effects per Program (each equivalent to a Trinity "Size 2" or two "Size 1" effects). The HI Synthesis engine also provides dual filters per digital oscillator configurable to either a series 24dB/octave resonant low-pass setting or else a parallel 12dB/octave high-pass plus 12dB/octave low-pass combination (which together can also be used similar to band-pass filter). Further, despite the very close similarly between the Triton and Trinity synthesis engines, PCM ROM, and effects processing, Korg programmed many of the Triton preset Programs and Combinations to appeal to the contemporary pop, dance, and hip-hop genres, making full use of the new dual arpeggiators and RPPR feature. All this essentially made Triton one of the best selling synths of the 2000s (its successors M3/M50 and later Krome sound engines are essentially improved Tritons with better UI and more wave ROM). Although it lost the sequencer audio tracks, digital input and output, these options were rarely installed in the Trinity, so the difference thereof was negligible. The onboard sampler was another significant improvement, as well as the "instant sequencing" function found in the latest firmware versions of Triton Classic and all subsequent Tritons (which allows the user to convert a combi into a song where all parts (programs) are instantly set up as tracks within a song). The Triton Extreme added in-track sampling support, allowing stereo samples to be recorded in context with a MIDI sequence and automatic triggering of the samples at their proper locations in the sequence during playback. The Triton Classic has since been re-released by Korg as a software synth (both standalone and VST), for use in digital music production, while hardware Tritons are still widely used by gigging musicians.

== Variants ==
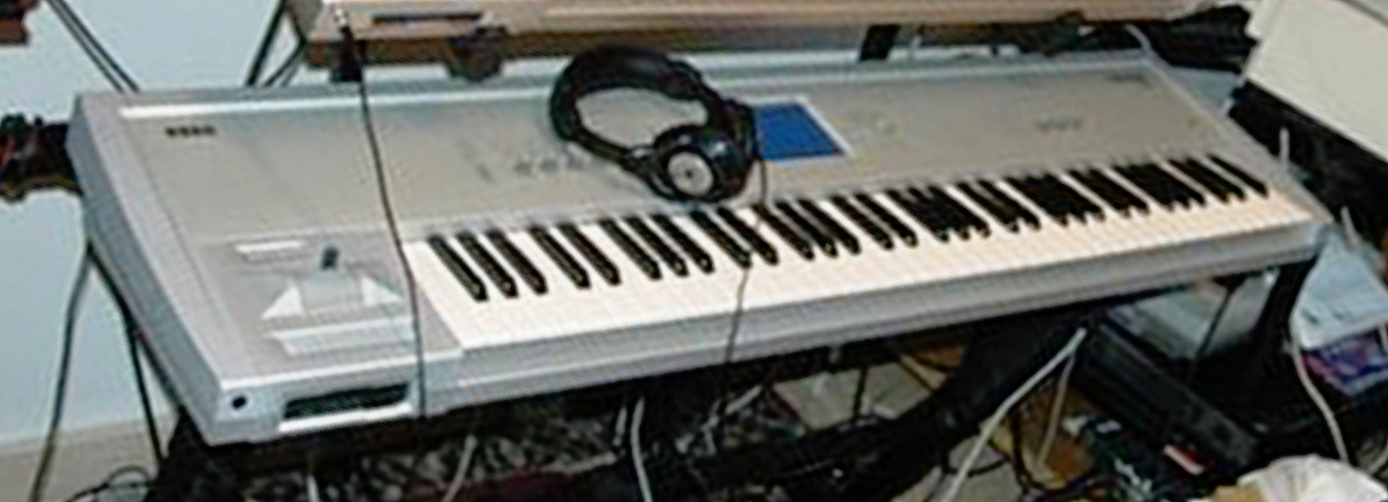
Korg Triton Pro

=== "Classic" ===
The original Triton was released in 1999 and became known as the "Classic" or "Classic 61" as subsequent models were released. The options available to buyers included a MOSS board, SCSI interface, two EXB-PCM expansion boards and 64MB RAM. It had a 61-key synth-/semi-weighted keyboard.

=== Pro and ProX "Classic" ===
The Pro was a 76-key synth-/semi-weighted workstation, while the ProX was an 88-key hammer-action/full-/piano-weighted workstation. Both were otherwise identical in specification to the Classic 61.

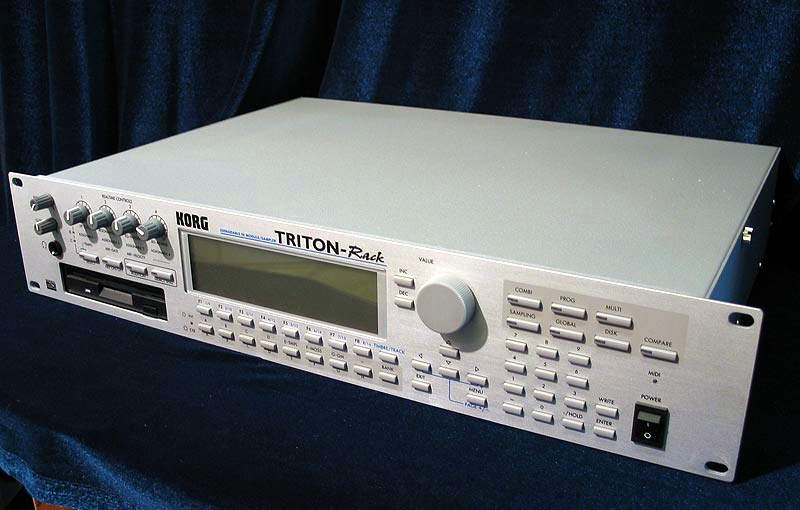
Korg Triton rack

=== Triton-Rack ===
The Triton-Rack was the rackmount version of the Triton. Since musicians would use it as a sound module rather than a complete workstation, requiring a separate keyboard to control it via MIDI, it was designed with different abilities. The oversized touchscreen was replaced with a smaller, more conventional 240x64-dot graphic LCD, with eight soft-keys under the LCD and cursor keys for user-interface navigation (essentially the same user interface later used in the Triton Le, Karma, and Korg TR keyboards), plus a rotary wheel and ten-key pad for data entry (like the touchscreen Tritons), while also retaining the knobs (here doing double-duty for both synthesizer and arepeggiator control) and floppy disk drive.

Though not equipped with a keyboard, it had advantages over Triton Classic 61, Pro, and ProX models, including storage of up to eight (instead of only two) EXB-PCM ROM boards containing additional sampled waveforms, many extra sound Program and Combi memory locations, expandability to maximum 96MB sample RAM (instead of only 64MB) and featured a built-in S/PDIF digital audio output (not available on the Classics).

Like the Classic models, the Triton-Rack featured sampling and could also support Korg's MOSS synthesizer expansion board (EXB-MOSS), distinguishing a so-expanded Triton-Rack as the only way to obtain MOSS synthesis (essentially identical to Korg's Z1 and extremely similar to Korg's Prophecy) in rack-mounted form, with the additional benefit of the Triton's seven-total assignable effects processors plus stereo EQ (more numerous, variable, and capable than those in Z1 or Prophecy) and layering/splitting with Triton-native sounds in Combination Mode, albeit with 6-voice polyphony compared to the Z1's 12 (or 18 with optional expansion.)

The Triton-Rack also supported the EXB-DI "Digital Interface" board providing ADAT output and Word Clock, or EXB-mLAN option featuring mLAN output.

=== KARMA ===
The Korg KARMA, released in 2001, featured the Triton synthesis technology with full effects processing, two PCM ROM expansion slots, and MOSS synthesizer expansion slot, but without both Triton's sampling/audio-input functionality and touchscreen interface. It included the more specialised KARMA music system instead of Triton's two programmable arpeggiators. It was only available in a 61-key version (with a lesser quality keyboard than the Triton).

=== Le ===
The Triton Le, released in 2002, was a stripped-down, cost-reduced version of the original Triton. It uses a smaller non-touch screen similar to the TRITON-RACK. The ribbon controller and floppy disk drive were omitted but a Smartmedia slot was instead included. A lighter and cheaper key bed than those used on the Trinity/original Triton range was installed, and the effects bus was downscaled from five insert effects to one. The MOSS, a Z1-based board, cannot be fitted on the Le. The functionality of the original sequencer and arpeggiator was retained, though. It was possible to load samples via the Smartmedia slot into the onboard sample RAM without requiring the sampling board to be fitted.

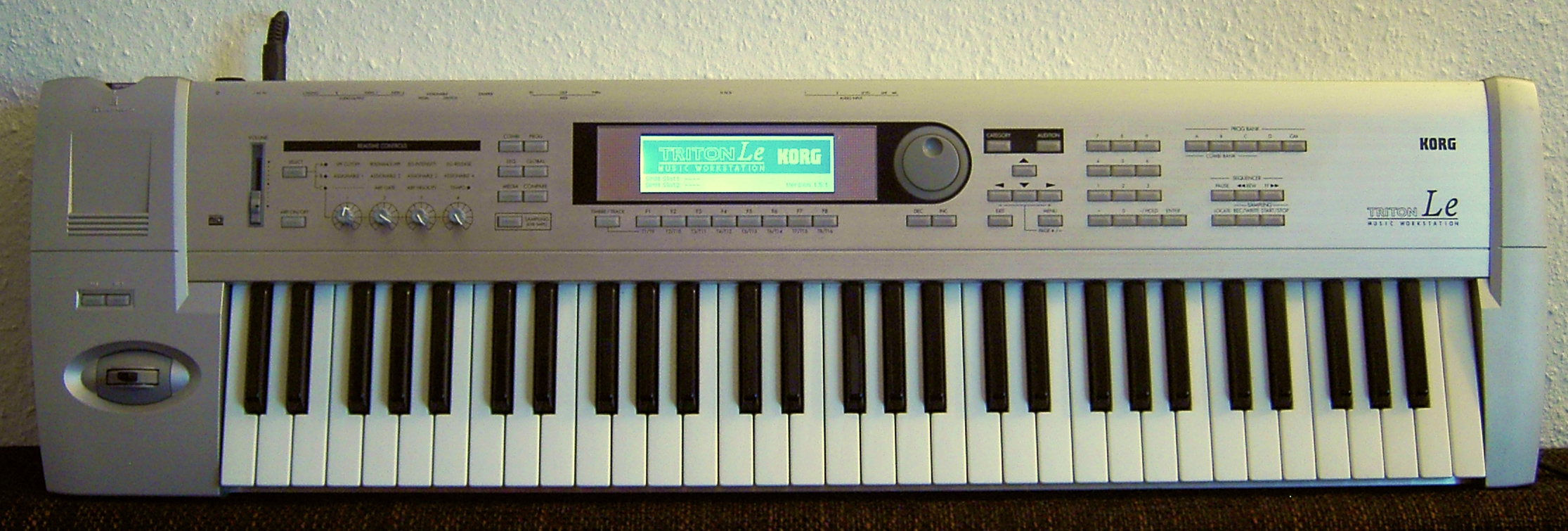
Korg Triton "Le"

Marketed at a much lower price than the original Triton range, the Le was a commercial success.

A special edition of Le was released featuring a black body, visually similar but functionally different from the later TR.

Three versions of "Le" are available :
Triton Le 61 – 61 keys
Triton Le 76 – 76 keys
Triton Le 88 – 88 keys (RH2 Real Weighted Hammer action)

=== Studio ===
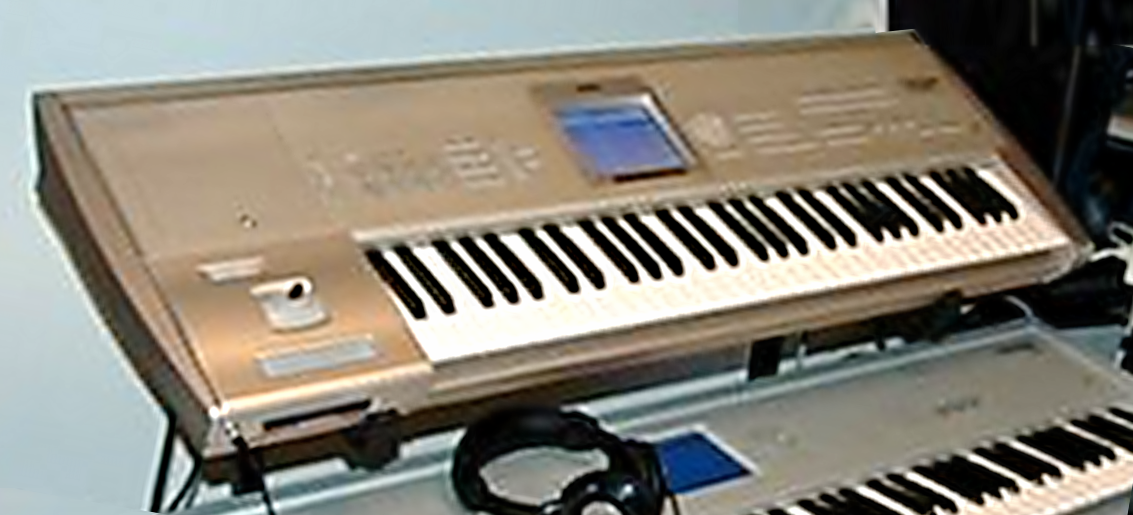
Korg Triton Studio 61 Keys

The Triton Studio, released in 2002, included the features of the "Classic" with about double polyphony (although split, with 60 polyphony dedicated to original 32MB ROM samples and all installed user-sample RAM, and an additional 60 polyphony for any installed EXB-PCM expansion sample ROM boards, including the built-in piano expansion), plus the addition of S/PDIF input and output, as well as the EXB-PCM08 piano expansion board, and some operating system enhancements. Sample RAM could be expanded to a maximum 96MB and a SCSI interface was included as standard. The instrument also had space for seven EXB-PCM sample expansion boards and could be fitted with an optional hard drive, internal CD-RW drive, EXB-DI expansion board with an ADAT interface or EXB-mLAN expansion board with mLAN interface.

=== Extreme ===
In 2004, Korg released the Triton Extreme, with many of the features of the Studio (such as the entire PCM ROM from the Studio model) plus the entire sample sets from Korg's best-selling Trance Attack, Orchestral Collection, and Vintage Archives expansion boards, as well as the most popular sounds from the Dance Extreme, Studio Essentials, and Pianos/Classic Keyboards collections. PCM data not available on any other Triton models was also included such as improved pianos and acoustic guitars. The 34MB ROM of the "Classic" was upgraded to 160MB.

Valve Force circuitry, using a vacuum tube and an analog ultra gain transistor to allow for warmer, guitar amp-like sounds for more extreme analog overdrive/distortion sounds was included, and proved especially useful for pad and organ sounds, as well as adding depth and realism to acoustic sounds, such as piano. Unlike previous Tritons, which were a white-silver color, the Extreme was finished in dark blue, though, much like with the Korg Trinity Plus and Triton LE, there also was a Special Edition version of the Extreme with a black finish, made exclusive to only the Domestic (Japanese) Market.

Like the Triton "Classic" and Studio, the Triton Extreme included a touch screen interface, along with the knob and button controls. A USB interface providing both Type A and Type B connectors enabled external storage and connectivity with a PC, facilitating exchange of samples, sound programs, sequences, and other Triton-compatible files. CompactFlash and microdrive cards up to 8 GB were supported, negating the need to sample directly to RAM. The USB port also allowed control of software synths and host applications via MIDI. However, unlike the "Classic", Studio, and Rack versions, the Extreme couldn't be fitted with sample expansion boards due to the expansion ROMs having been pre-installed. It was compatible, though, with the MOSS board and up to 96 MB of sample RAM. Optical stereo S/PDIF inputs and outputs were installed but no SCSI, mLAN or ADAT interfaces were included.

The USB Type A connector can be used to connect a USB thumb drive, hard drive or CD writer drive for making music CDs and loading AKAI format sample libraries. The sequencer was upgraded to facilitate in-track sampling.

The 76-key version of the Triton Extreme is also seen as the keyboard of choice for Tsumugi Kotobuki in the anime K-On!.

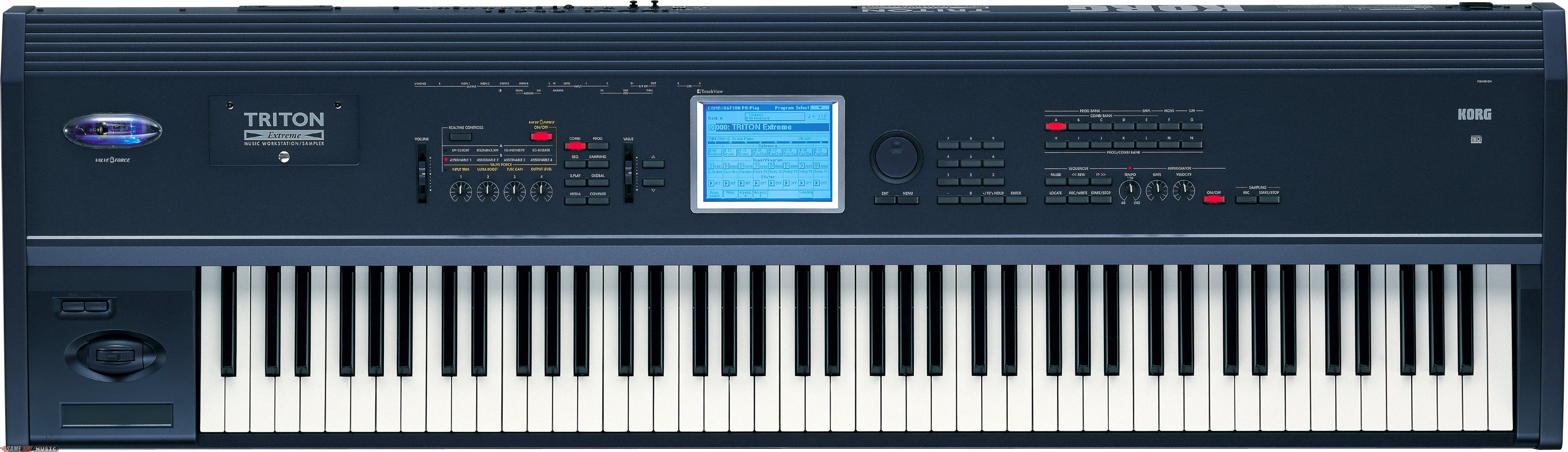
Triton Extreme 88 Keys

=== TR ===
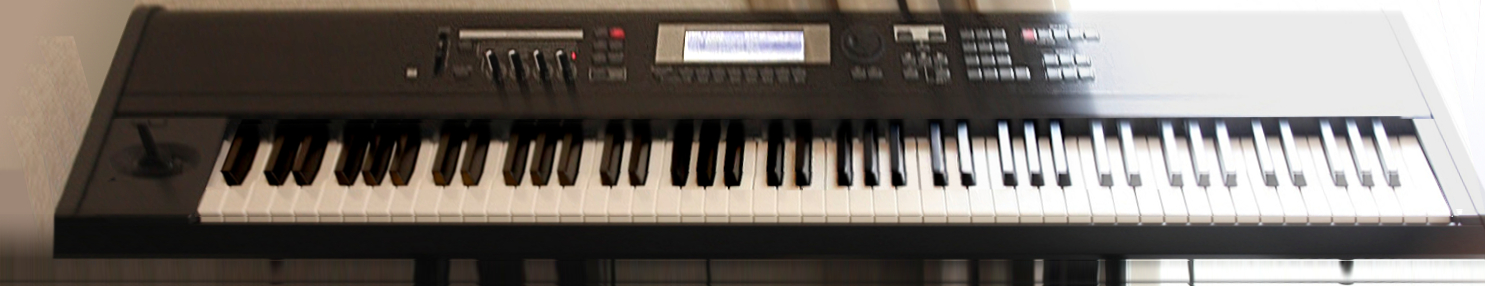
Korg TR88 (2007)

Released in 2005, the TR was similar to the Triton Le but included expanded ROM and additional programs and combinations. It also features a USB cable for data connection with a PC. The TR also features an SD card slot. The piano quality was also improved compared to the "Classic" and Le keyboards.

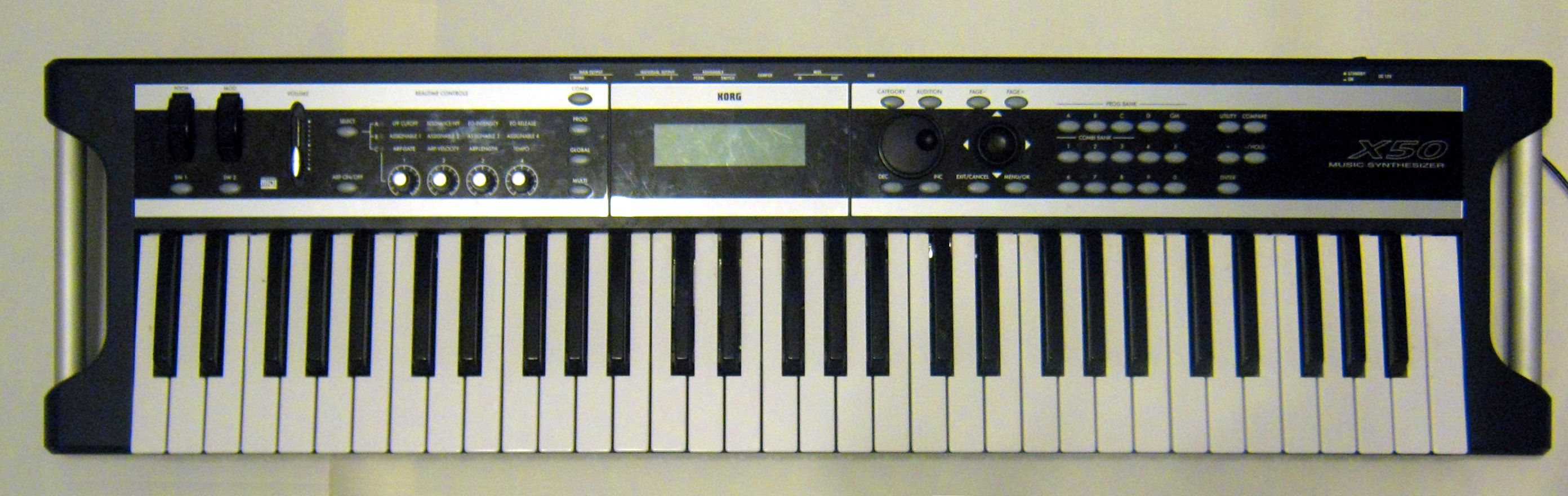
Korg X50

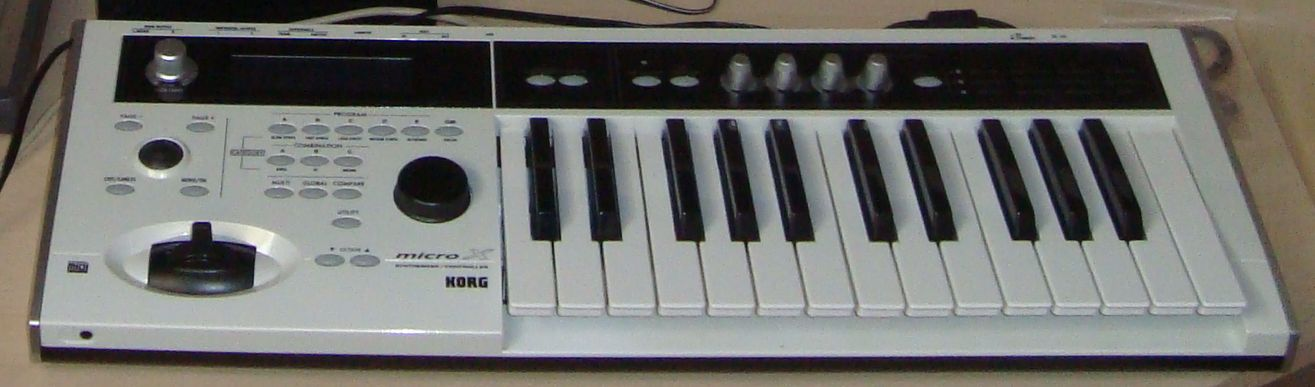
Korg microX

=== X50 and MicroX ===
The X50 and MicroX, released in 2007, were oriented towards the lower end of the market and were consequently less physically robust and included fewer features. They contained the same HI synthesis engine found on the TR with the basic Triton and extended ROM: the X50 maintains the same extended ROM as the TR, while the MicroX extended ROM focused more on drum and percussion samples. Neither had the sequencing or expansion capability of the TR. USB connection was available for high-speed MIDI control (and use with the included plug-in editor), but incompatibilities with the other Tritons hampered the use of libraries for those keyboards. The main difference between the two keyboards was in scale and control layout: the X50 was a 61-key keyboard with pitch and modulation wheels, while the MicroX had only 25 keys with the Triton joystick. Neither had the aftertouch functionality of the TR keyboard. Both included patch editor and librarian software as well as a plug-in for DAW control, allowing the import and export of Triton-compatible files. Similarly to the LE and TR, only one insert effect and two master effects could be assigned.

=== Triton Taktile ===
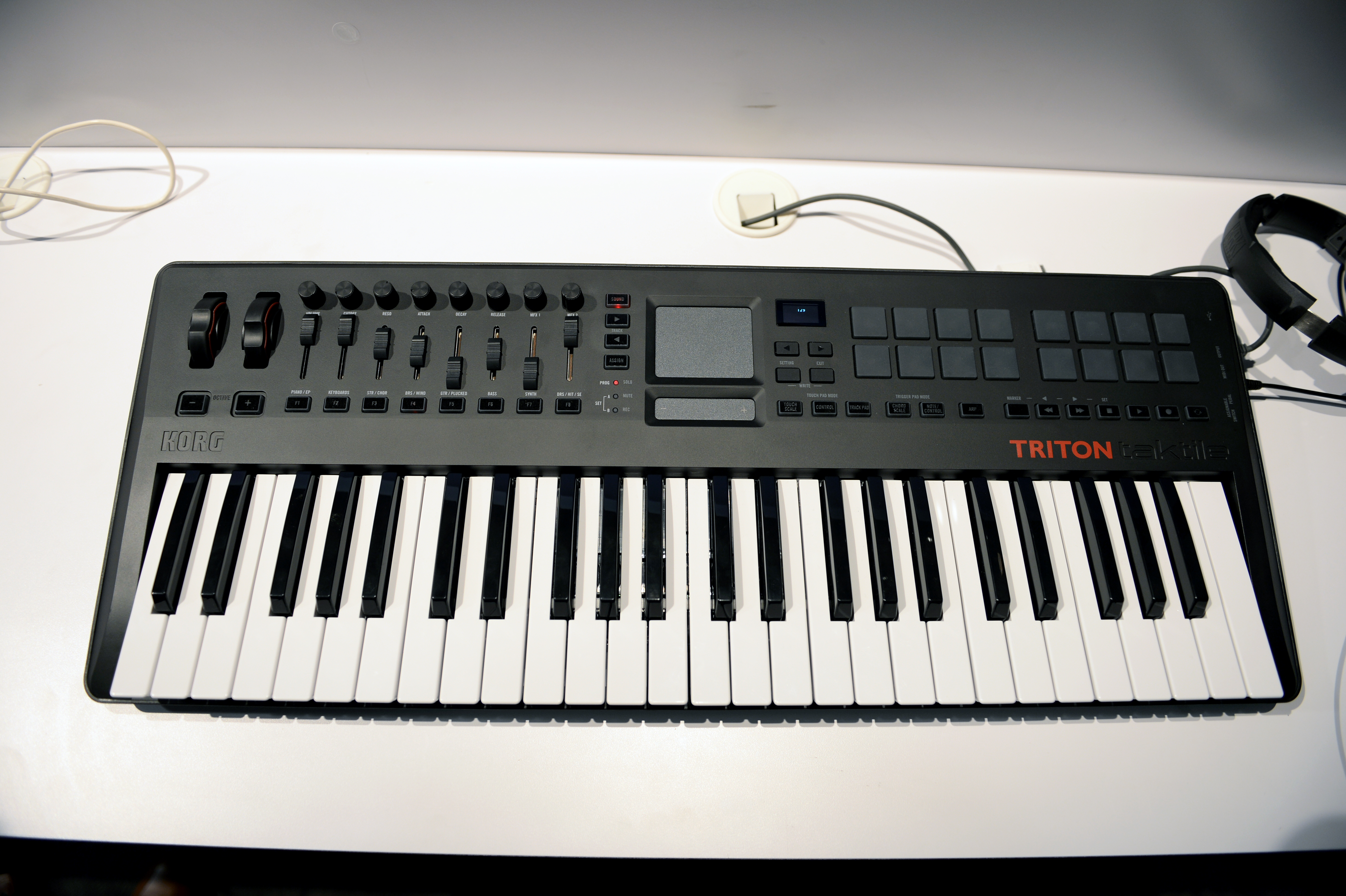
Korg Triton Taktile

A USB-powered controller with the 512 programs from the original factory bank of the Classic, the Triton Taktile was released in 2014 as the first Korg Triton model in seven years since 2007, and is offered in 25- and 49-key versions, with the same semi-weighted (though without aftertouch) keyboard used on the KROME. It includes a touch pad inherited from the Kaossilator that lets you play melodies using just a single finger, velocity-sensitive trigger pads (16 on the 49-key, 8 on the 25-key) that let you generate chords in the key and scale of your choice, an arpeggiator, ribbon controller, sliders and switches. Audio output is a stereo 1/8'' mini headphone jack. The onboard sounds can't be edited, layered or split, and playback is mono‑timbral.

=== Triton Classic and Extreme VSTi ===
On December 26, 2019, Korg released a VSTi software version of the Classic Korg Triton, complete with all of its expansion packs, then followed it up with another VSTi Version of the Korg Triton Extreme on July 28, 2021. Both are available as part of the Korg Collection of VST software meant to replicate their previous hardware synths.

== Features ==
All models, except the Triton Rack, X50, Micro-X, KARMA and Taktile were available in 61, 76 and 88-key configurations. They could also be upgraded with increased sample EDO RAM and expansion boards for additional sounds; only the Triton Le did not provide this feature. Additionally with the Triton Extreme, this feature is now provided as pre-installed. The Triton "Classic", Extreme, and Studio were controlled by a touchscreen. The KARMA, Le and Rack, however, featured a more conventional display. With the Triton Extreme, the expansion boards were now pre-installed.

Model	Year of release	Wave ROM size, MB	Features	Polyphony	Number of keys
Triton	1999	32	sequencer, sampler	62	61/76/88
Triton Rack	2000	32	sampler	60	None
KARMA	2001	32	sequencer, KARMA	62	61
Triton Le	2002	32	sequencer 16 tracks MIDI, sampler (optional)	62	61/76
Triton Le 88	2002	32 + 16 (piano bank)	sequencer 16 tracks MIDI, sampler (optional)	62	88
Triton Studio	2002	32 + 16 (piano bank)	sequencer, S/PDIF, CD-ROM, HDD option	60 × 2 banks	61/76/88
Triton Extreme	2004	160	sequencer, Valve Force circuitry (using a 12AU7 "Russian Bullet" tube), USB MIDI link, CF card slot, sampler with in-track sampling	60 × 2 banks	61/76/88
TR 61/76/88	2006-07	64	sequencer, USB MIDI link, SD card slot, 64Mb PCM, sampler (optional)	62	61/76/88
MicroX	2007	64	USB MIDI link, 64Mb PCM: 32Mb Triton "Classic" + 32Mb unique, Editor Program Librarian software and Plugin (VST)	62	25
X50	2007	64	USB MIDI link, 64Mb PCM: same as TR, Editor Program Librarian software and Plugin (VST)	62	61

== Availability ==
All pre-2007 models of the Korg Triton model range had been discontinued by the manufacturer as of 2008. Nowadays, the Triton Taktile has remained in production.

Today, the Best Of Triton Soundbanks can be found on Korg's website as downloadable programs for the Korg Krome workstation, KORG Pa4X Professional arranger, KRONOS as well as an in app purchasable soundbank for the full version of the korg sound module for iOS. On December 26, 2019, Korg released a VST plugin replicating the Korg Triton, including all factory patches & waveforms, and the full collection of EXB-PCM expansions.

== Notable users ==
- Andy Stott
- BT
- Chris Lowe of Pet Shop Boys
- Moka Only
- The Neptunes
- Pharrell Williams
- Phil Collins
- Timbaland
- Wiley

== See also ==
- Korg Trinity
- Korg KARMA
- Korg OASYS
- Alesis Fusion
- Roland Fantom-X
- Roland Juno-G
- Yamaha Motif
- Sampler
- Synthesizer
- Polyphony
