= MM8 =

MM8 may refer to:

- Mega Man 8, a 1996 video game in the Mega Man series
- Might and Magic VIII: Day of the Destroyer, a 2000 video role-playing game in the Might and Magic series
- Yamaha MM8, an 88-key version of the Yamaha MM6
- MM8, standard used by the Multimedia Messaging Service in mobile networks, see MMS Architecture
- MM8 Chula, a group of students that taking MM or Master of Management program at Chulalongkorn University which is located in Bangkok, Thailand
