= MM6 =

MM6 may refer to:

- Mega Man 6, a 1993 video game for the NES
- Might and Magic VI: The Mandate of Heaven, a 1998 video game for the PC
- Yamaha MM6, a 61-key synthesizer keyboard
- MM6 register, a CPU register used by the MMX extension
- Maison Margiela, a French luxury fashion house
