= Alesis Fusion =

Music production workstation

Alesis Fusion 6HD/8HD
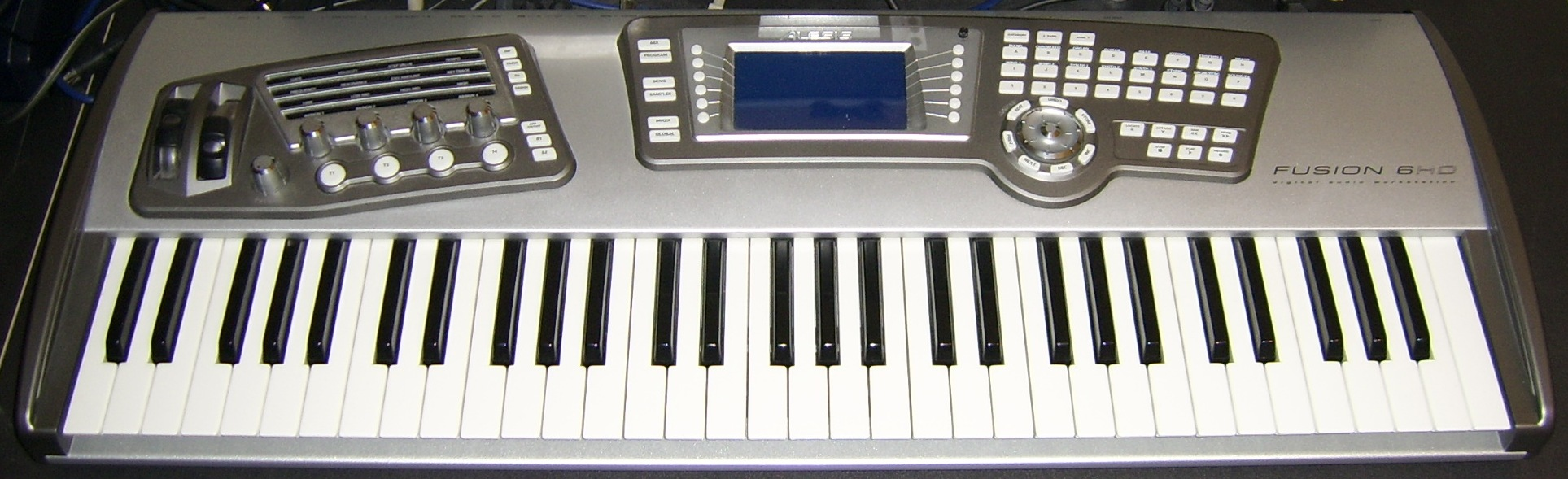
- Alesis Fusion 6HD
- Manufacturer: Alesis
- Dates: 2005 - 2008

Technical specifications
- Polyphony: Dynamic processor allocation varies depending on the complexity of the program.
- Timbrality: 16 parts in Mix mode; 32 Parts in Song mode
- LFO: 8 per voice
- Synthesis type: Sample Playback, Virtual Analog, FM and Physical Modeling
- Filter: 26 filter types in most synthesis types provided
- Aftertouch expression: Yes
- Velocity expression: Yes
- Storage memory: 64MB×2 - Expandable up to 192MB×2, for a total of 384MB via the E3 Memory Upgrade
- Effects: 80 + 3-band parametric EQ

Input/output
- Keyboard: 6HD - 61 note semi weighted; 8HD - 88 note fully weighted
- External control: USB for file exchange only. MIDI in, out, thru

Alesis Fusion is a music production workstation produced by Alesis introduced in early 2005. It uses four different types of synthesis: sample and synthesis, virtual analog, FM and physical modeling. It includes sampling capability through analog inputs and importing audio samples from a computer or memory card.

== Models ==
The workstation is available in two models. The Fusion 6HD is a sixty-one note semi-weighted keyboard workstation. The Fusion 8HD is an eighty-eight note weighted keyboard workstation. The two models are identical aside from the keyboard type. It competes with the Korg Triton, the Yamaha Motif and the Roland Fantom-X.
