= Roland Fantom =

Synthesizer

- Manufacturer: Roland
- Dates: 2001 - present

Technical specifications
- Synthesis type: digital synthesizer

Input/output

The Fantom is a line of music workstations/synthesizers produced by Roland Corporation since 2001, when the Fantom line took over from the Roland XP-80.

Roland Fantom models
Model name	Year	Keys	Synth engine	Price on release	Reference
Fantom (Fantom, FA76)	2001	76 with aftertouch	PCM, with max 2 SRX expansion boards, and one SR-JV card	£1699	
Fantom S (S, S88)	2003	61–88 with aftertouch	PCM and sampling, with max 4 SRX expansion boards	£1799	
Fantom X (X6, X7, X8)	2004	61–88 with aftertouch	PCM and sampling, with max 4 SRX expansion boards	£1599	
Fantom XR	2004	Rackmount	PCM and sampling, with max 6 SRX expansion boards	£999	
Fantom Xa	2005	61 with velocity	PCM and sampling	£1099	
Fantom G (G6, G7, G8)	2008	61–88 with aftertouch	PCM and sampling	£1949	
Fantom FA0 (FA06, FA07, FA08)	2014 (FA06, FA08) 2016 (FA07)	61–88 with velocity	PCM, sampling and SuperNatural	£1299	
Fantom (Fantom 6, Fantom 7, Fantom 8)	2019	61–88 with aftertouch	Zen-Core, V-Piano, SuperNatural, Sampling	£3069	
Fantom 0 (Fantom 06, Fantom 07, Fantom 08)	2022	61–88 with velocity	Zen-Core, SuperNatural, Sampling	£1249	
Fantom EX (Fantom 6 EX, Fantom 7 EX, Fantom 8 EX)	2024	61–88 with aftertouch	Zen-Core, SuperNatural, ACB, Sampling	$3199	
