= Yamaha MO =

The Yamaha MO6/MO8 is a music production synthesizer that comes in two sizes. The MO6 is the 61-key while the MO8 is the 88 weighted key version. The two versions use Yamaha's AWM2 (Advanced Wave Memory 2) tone generator also used in the Motif and the Motif ES series of synths and comes with 175MB of waveform memory, 64 voices of polyphony (124 Max in sequencer), 512 preset programs with 256 User voice and 129 GM voice, over 1700 arpeggio programs, and over 18 different filter types navigated through the 240x64 LCD.

The MO-series keyboards have been discontinued by Yamaha, and were replaced by the MoX series. Currently, the MoX series has also been superseded by the MoXF-series, whose sound engine is derived from the company's fifth-generation Motif XF series. The units are designed to be integrated with a PC running Steinberg's Cubase, since that company is partly owned by Yamaha.

Sounds

The Yamaha MO6/MO8's sounds are based on the Yamaha Motif ES sound set and includes pianos, electric pianos, organs, guitars, strings, pads, percussion and special effects.

Other Features

Among other features, the MO6/MO8 comes with four knobs and four data sliders designed for real time control of the sound. The MO6/MO8 effects processor has 190 effects including 116 insertion effects. The MO6/MO8 also has scene capture mode, remote mode, S/PDIF 24 bit 44.1 kHz digital outs and two USB ports.

Model	Year	Number of keys	Key action	Polyphony	Waveform ROM	Waveforms	Memory
MO 6	2006	61	FS	64	175MB	1,859	768 presets + 64 kits, 384 user + 32 kits, 128 performances, 128 multis
MO 8	2006	88	Balanced hammer effect	64	175MB	1,859	768 presets + 64 kits, 384 user + 32 kits, 128 performances, 128 multis

== See also ==
- Yamaha Motif
- Yamaha MM6
- Yamaha MOX
- Yamaha MX
