= MLAN =

Music and media network based on FireWire

mLAN, short for Music Local Area Network, is a protocol for synchronized transmission and management of multi-channel digital audio, video, control signals and multi-port MIDI over a network.

== Description ==
The mLAN protocol was originally developed by Yamaha Corporation, and publicly introduced in January 2000. It was available under a royalty-free license to anyone interested in utilizing the technology.

mLAN uses several features of the IEEE 1394 (FireWire) standard such as isochronous transfer and intelligent connection management. There are two versions of the mLAN protocol. Version 1 requires S200 rate, while Version 2 requires S400 rate and supports synchronized streaming of digital audio at up to 24 bit word length and 192 kHz sample rate, MIDI and word clock at a bitrate up to 400 Megabits per second.

With the proper driver software, a computer-based digital audio workstation can interact with mLAN-compliant hardware via any OHCI-compliant FireWire port. mLAN consumes the entire bus bandwidth when operating and non-mLAN devices cannot share the same Firewire connection, so it is not possible to use hard drives, optical drives or other sound devices on the same Firewire bus when mLAN Manager software is running.

The transport layers of mLAN have been standardized as IEC 61883.

== End of life ==
By 2005, over 100 manufacturers were part of the mLAN Alliance however very few actual products had surfaced.

As of early 2008, mLAN appeared to have reached the end of its product life. Third-party developers discontinued or retracted their mLAN products from the market, and Yamaha itself ceased any new releases of mLAN hardware or updates to the mLAN software and drivers. Even though more recent FireWire based products from Yamaha could interoperate with earlier mLAN devices using a computer, any mention of mLAN is notably absent from new product announcements and driver updates.

== Products ==
- Yamaha 01X digital mixing hub
- Yamaha i88x audio/MIDI interface
- Yamaha mLAN8E Expansion Board for Yamaha A5000/A4000 samplers and Yamaha CS6x/CS6R/S80 synthesizers
- Yamaha mLAN16E/mLAN16E2 options for Yamaha Motif, Yamaha Motif ES, Yamaha S90 ES, Yamaha Motif XS, Yamaha Motif-Rack XS
- Yamaha MY16-mLAN option for Yamaha digital mixers
- Korg EXB-mLAN option for Korg Triton Rack and Korg Triton Studio
- Presonus FIREStation audio/MIDI interface
- Kurzweil KMLN8 8 Channel mLAN I/O option for KSP-8 Multi-Channel effects processor

== See also ==
- ADAT
- Audio over Ethernet
- MADI
- MIDI
- Open Sound Control
- RTP MIDI
- ZIPI
