= Yamaha Motif =

Series of music workstations

The Yamaha Motif (stylized in all-uppercase MOTIF) is a series of music workstation synthesizers, first released by Yamaha Corporation in August 2001. The Motif replaced the EX series in Yamaha's line-up and was also based on the early Yamaha S series. Other workstations in the same class are the Korg Kronos and the Roland Fantom G. The series' successor is Yamaha Montage, released in 2016, followed up by the Yamaha Montage M in 2023.

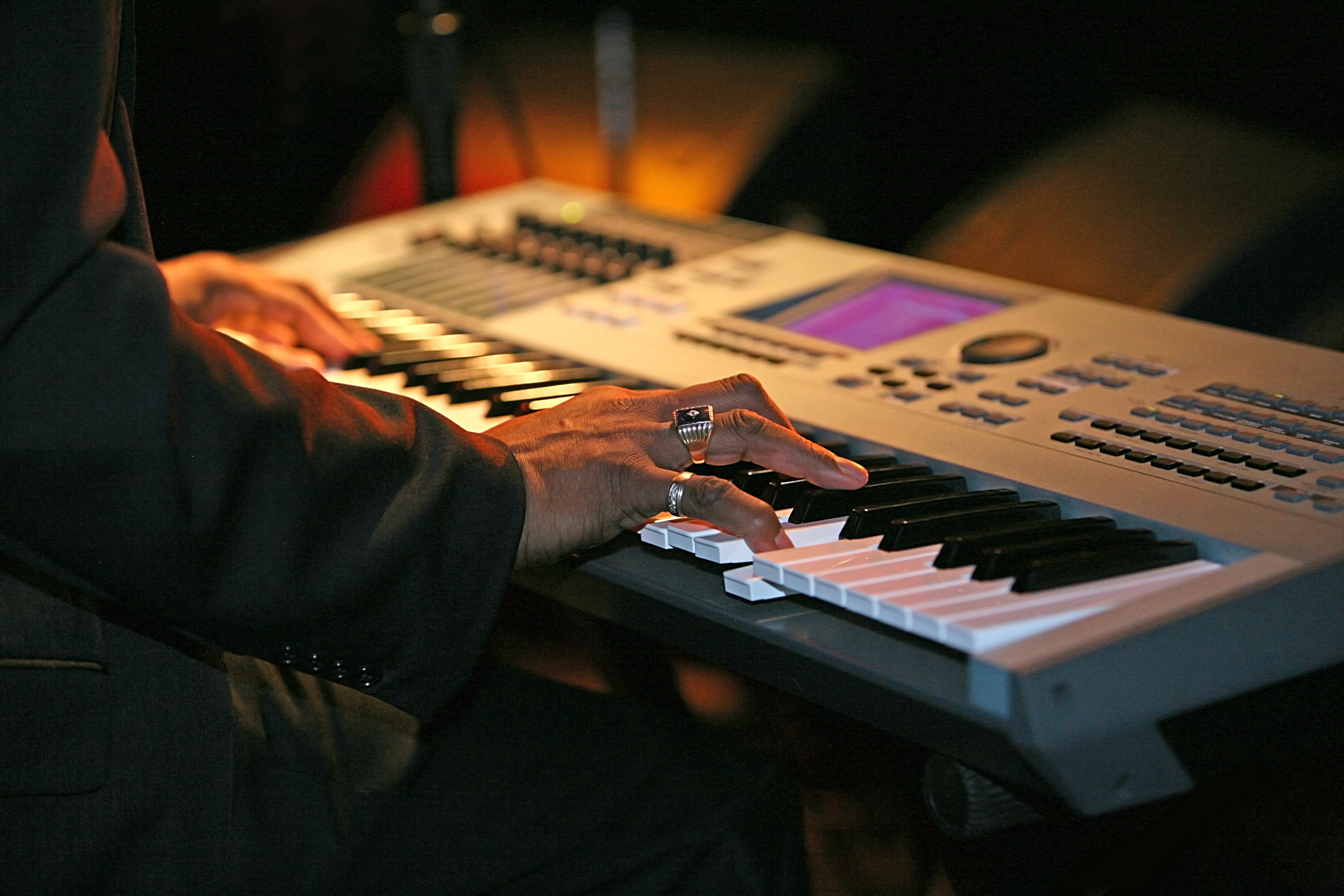

== Products ==
=== First generation ===
Original MOTIF series, now called "MOTIF Classic", were released in four variants in 2001:

Model	Year	Number of keys	Key action	Polyphony	Waveform ROM	Waveforms	Memory
MOTIF 6	2001	61	FS (semi-weighted)	62	48MB chip-ROM or "84MB (when converted to 16-bit linear format)" (i.e. decompressed)	1,309	384 presets + 48 kits, 128 user, 128 performances, 128 master
MOTIF 7	2001	76	FS	62	48MB chip-ROM or "84MB (when converted to 16-bit linear format)" (i.e. decompressed)	1,309	384 presets + 48 kits, 128 user, 128 performances, 128 master
MOTIF 8	2001	88	Balanced hammer effect	62	48MB chip-ROM or "84MB (when converted to 16-bit linear format)" (i.e. decompressed)	1,309	384 presets + 48 kits, 128 user, 128 performances, 128 master
MOTIF-RACK	2001	—N/a	—N/a	128	48MB chip-ROM or "84MB (when converted to 16-bit linear format)" (i.e. decompressed)	1,309	640 presets + 48 kits, 256 user + 32 kits, 59 performances, 65 multis

The balanced hammer effect action is the same action found on Yamaha S90 series keyboards.

MOTIF Rack is a sound module (with no keyboard) that is controlled by external MIDI instruments. It can be expanded with two Modular Synthesis Plug-in boards but has no sampling capabilities.

=== MM ===
In January (2007), Yamaha introduced two "retro" models; the MM6 (61 keys) and MM8 (88 keys), both based on the original 2001 Motif sound set and samples, with polyphony greatly reduced to fit the lower specifications. This synthesizer comes default with 418 patches and 22 drum kits. Aside from basic Motif samples, most of the other available sounds are based on the lower-end Yamaha PSR electronic keyboards.

Model	Year	Number of keys	Key action	Polyphony	Waveform ROM	Memory
MM6	2007	61	FS	32	70MB	418 presets + 22 kits, 64 user
MM8	2008	88	GHS	32	70MB	418 presets + 22 kits, 64 user

GHS (Graded Hammer Standard) action is the same action on Yamaha's high end digital pianos.

=== Second generation: MOTIF ES ===
MOTIF ES, a successor to original MOTIF series, debuted at the NAMM Summer Session in 2003:

Model	Year	Number of keys	Key action	Polyphony	Waveform ROM	Waveforms	Memory
MOTIF ES6	2003	61	FS	128	96MB chip-ROM or "175MB (when converted to 16-bit linear format)" (i.e. decompressed)	1,859	768 presets + 64 kits, 384 user + 32 kits, 128 performances, 128 multis
MOTIF ES7	2003	76	FS	128	96MB chip-ROM or "175MB (when converted to 16-bit linear format)" (i.e. decompressed)	1,859	768 presets + 64 kits, 384 user + 32 kits, 128 performances, 128 multis
MOTIF ES8	2003	88	Balanced hammer effect	128	96MB chip-ROM or "175MB (when converted to 16-bit linear format)" (i.e. decompressed)	1,859	768 presets + 64 kits, 384 user + 32 kits, 128 performances, 128 multis
MOTIF-RACK ES	2003	—N/a	—N/a	128	96MB chip-ROM or "175MB (when converted to 16-bit linear format)" (i.e. decompressed)	1,859	768 presets + 64 kits, 384 user + 32 kits, 128 performances, 128 multis

=== MO ===
In January 2006, Yamaha launched two entry-level variants of the MOTIF ES - the 61 key MO6 and 88 key MO8. Though containing half the polyphony and fewer preset sound programs, these models contain all the MOTIF ES sample sets, along with arpeggios and a song and pattern sequencer. Lacking are the professional MOTIF ES features such as mLAN connectivity, Yamaha PLG integration, sampling and multiple foot controllers.

Model	Year	Number of keys	Key action	Polyphony	Waveform ROM	Waveforms	Memory
MO 6	2006	61	FS	64	175MB	1,859	768 presets + 64 kits, 384 user + 32 kits, 128 performances, 128 multis
MO 8	2006	88	Balanced hammer effect	64	175MB	1,859	768 presets + 64 kits, 384 user + 32 kits, 128 performances, 128 multis

=== Third generation: MOTIF XS ===
The XS versions were announced at the NAMM Show in 2007:

Model	Year	Number of keys	Key action	Polyphony	Waveform ROM	Waveforms	Memory
MOTIF XS6	2007	61	FSX	128	128MB chip-ROM or "355MB (when converted to 16-bit linear format)" (i.e. decompressed)	2,670	1,024 presets + 65 kits, 384 user + 32 kits, 384 performances
MOTIF XS7	2007	76	FSX	128	128MB chip-ROM or "355MB (when converted to 16-bit linear format)" (i.e. decompressed)	2,670	1,024 presets + 65 kits, 384 user + 32 kits, 384 performances
MOTIF XS8	2007	88	Balanced hammer effect	128	128MB chip-ROM or "355MB (when converted to 16-bit linear format)" (i.e. decompressed)	2,670	1,024 presets + 65 kits, 384 user + 32 kits, 384 performances
MOTIF-RACK XS	2008	—N/a	—N/a	128	128MB chip-ROM or "355MB (when converted to 16-bit linear format)" (i.e. decompressed)	2,670	1,024 presets + 65 kits, 384 user + 32 kits, 128 multis

MOTIF has a mLAN connection for transferring MIDI and sound to a PC.

The MOTIF XS operating system is based on MontaVista Linux.

=== MOX ===
In 2011, Yamaha introduced an entry-level variant of the MOTIF XS: the 61-key MOX6 and 88-key MOX8. Though containing half the polyphony and fewer insert effects of the XS, the MoX series contains all the MOTIF XS Wave ROM and voice presets, along with arpeggios and a song and pattern sequencer. The number of performances in the MoX is reduced to 256. The MoX does not support user sampling, nor does it support the mLAN/FireWire expansion. The MoX feature a built-in 4-out/2-in USB audio interface users can use to record audio directly from the keyboard or an outside source to a computer, as well as play and control VST instruments directly through the keyboard via USB.

Model	Year	Number of keys	Key action	Polyphony	Waveform ROM	Waveforms	Memory
MOX6	2011	61	FS	64	355MB	2,670	1,024 presets + 64 Kits, 384 user + 32 kits, 256 performances, 128 multis
MOX8	2011	88	GHS	64	355MB	2,670	1,024 presets + 64 Kits, 384 user + 32 kits, 256 performances, 128 multis

=== MX ===
The current version of the entry-level Motif lineup, also based on the soundset of the Motif XS. It features the same voices as the XS, although with less WaveROM (166 MB vs. the XS's 355 MB), fewer performances (128), fewer arpeggios (999), and fewer editable parameters. The MX series also has no sequencer. It featured a similar USB audio/MIDI interface as the MoX series. The MX is playable in 16-part multi-timbral performance mode, configurable with the third-party Vycro editor. It is also the only keyboard in the Motif family available in a 49-key model (alongside the 61-key MX61).

A version with 88 GHS (Graded Hammer Standard) weighted keys, the MX88, was announced by Yamaha in April 2017.

Model	Year	Number of keys	Key action	Polyphony	Waveform ROM	Waveforms	Memory
MX49	2012	49	FS	128	166MB	?	Preset: 1,106 Normal Voices + 61 Drum Kits, GM: 128 Normal Voices + 1 Drum Kit, User: 128 Normal Voices + 8 Drum Kits
MX61	2012	61	FS	128	166MB	?	Preset: 1,106 Normal Voices + 61 Drum Kits, GM: 128 Normal Voices + 1 Drum Kit, User: 128 Normal Voices + 8 Drum Kits
MX88	2017	88	GHS	128	166MB	?	Preset: 1,106 Normal Voices + 61 Drum Kits, GM: 128 Normal Voices + 1 Drum Kit, User: 128 Normal Voices + 8 Drum Kits

=== Fourth generation: MOTIF XF ===
The XF versions were announced via www.MOTIFator.com on August 2, 2010:

Model	Year	Number of keys	Key action	Polyphony	Waveform ROM	Waveforms	Memory
MOTIF XF6	2010	61	FSX	128	256MB chip-ROM or "741MB (when converted to 16-bit linear format)" (i.e. decompressed)	3,977	1,024 presets + 64 kits, 512 user + 32 kits, 512 performances
MOTIF XF7	2010	76	FSX	128	256MB chip-ROM or "741MB (when converted to 16-bit linear format)" (i.e. decompressed)	3,977	1,024 presets + 64 kits, 512 user + 32 kits, 512 performances
MOTIF XF8	2010	88	Balanced hammer effect	128	256MB chip-ROM or "741MB (when converted to 16-bit linear format)" (i.e. decompressed)	3,977	1,024 presets + 64 kits, 512 user + 32 kits, 512 performances

While the preset voices in the MOTIF XF are the same as in the previous XS model, the XF includes an extra user bank containing 128 brand new voices. Also, eight new drum kits are also included in the user bank area. The biggest addition in the XF is the 512MB / 1024MB flash memory, which users can use to instantaneously import or load samples and sounds. In 2014, Yamaha announced the 40th anniversary white versions of the MOTIF XF called the MOTIF XF WH Series, which are available for all three models—as MOTIF XF6, MOTIF XF7 & MOTIF XF8.

=== MOXF ===
In 2013, Yamaha launched two 'lite' versions of the MOTIF XF - the 61-key MoXF6 and 88-key MoXF8. The MoXF series contains all the MOTIF XF WaveROM, polyphony and voice presets, along with arpeggios and a song and pattern sequencer. The MoXF does not support on-board user sampling, nor does it support the mLAN/FireWire expansion. It features one slot for a flash memory board (versus 2 on the flagship XF), allowing users to load additional sample libraries from third-party sources. The MoXF also features the same USB MIDI/audio interface seen on the MoX series.

Model	Year	Number of keys	Key action	Polyphony	Waveform ROM	Waveforms	Memory
MOXF6	2013	61	FS	128	741MB	3,977	1,152 presets + 72 Kits, 384 user + 32 kits, 256 performances
MOXF8	2013	88	GHS	128	741MB	3,977	1,152 presets + 72 Kits, 384 user + 32 kits, 256 performances

== Software architecture ==
Starting with the third generation (Motif XS), Yamaha transitioned the series' operating system to a Linux-based architecture, specifically utilizing MontaVista Linux. This architectural shift continued through the Motif XF and into its successors, the Yamaha Montage and Yamaha MODX series.

In compliance with open-source licensing, Yamaha maintains a public repository of the GPL and LGPL source code used in these instruments. This allows users and developers to access the source code for the open-source portions of the firmware for models including the Motif XS, Motif XF, and the Rack variants. This transparency distinguishes Yamaha's implementation from other proprietary workstations in its class, as it provides documented access to the underlying system software for a period of at least three years after the latest factory shipment.

== Specifications ==
=== Comparison ===
Feature	Original MOTIF	MOTIF ES	MOTIF XS	MOTIF XF
Tone generator	AWM2 (complying with the Modular Synthesis Plug-in System)		AWM2 with Expanded articulations	AWM2 with Expanded articulations
MIDI sequencer capacity	110,000 notes @ 480 ppq	226,000 notes @ 480 ppq	130,000 notes @ 480 ppq	130,000 notes @ 480 ppq
Polyphony voices	64	128	128	128
Sample formats compatibility	Original, WAV, AIFF, Yamaha A3000/A4000/A5000 (load only), Akai S1000/S3000 (load only)	Original, WAV, AIFF, Yamaha A3000/A4000/A5000 (load only), Akai S1000/S3000 (load only)	Original, WAV, AIFF	Original, WAV, AIFF
ROM size, MB	48MB physical-ROM or "84MB (when converted to 16-bit linear format)" (aka decompressed)	96MB physical-ROM or "175MB (when converted to 16-bit linear format)" (aka decompressed)	128MB physical-ROM or "355MB (when converted to 16-bit linear format)" (aka decompressed)	256MB physical-ROM or "741MB (when converted to 16-bit linear format)" (aka decompressed)

=== MOTIF Classic ===
- AWM2 PCM tone generator
- 110,000 note MIDI sequencer @ 480 ppqn
- Sample engine (4MB built-in, expandable up to 64MB of user RAM)
- Compatibility with common sample formats such as Akai, WAV, and AIFF
- 48MB PCM physical-ROM or "84MB (when converted to 16-bit linear format)" (aka decompressed)
- 62-voice polyphony

MOTIF keyboards include three internal expansion slots (two on the rack-mount version). These slots allow the user to augment the instrument's soundset through the purchase of Yamaha PLG Expansion Boards. The MOTIF Classic featured 4MB of onboard sampling RAM, which could be increased to 64MB with the purchase of third party memory sticks. External connectors include a FireWire 400 port for connecting an mLAN network card; a USB 1 port for connecting the instrument to a computer via a MIDI cable OR for external storage; and a SmartMedia port for storing sequence, voice, and sample data (which requires a third-party SmartMedia card).

=== MOTIF ES ===
- AWM2 Tone Generator (complying with the Modular Synthesis Plug-in System)
- 128 note polyphony
- 226,000 note MIDI sequencer @ 480 ppqn
- Audio Input ports: A/D, AIEB2, mLAN, Stereo IN
- PCM Wave ROM: 96MB physical-ROM or "175MB (when converted to 16-bit linear format)" (aka decompressed), 1,859 waveforms

All MOTIF ES synthesizers feature a selection of sounds, and use a sample-based subtractive synthesis engine. The MOTIF ES6, ES7 and ES8 feature 16 track sequencers that can use MIDI and sample tracks, and 512MB of sample memory can be fitted for completely new sounds. Physical modeling, virtual analogue synthesis, FM synthesis plus additional sample sets can be installed with Yamaha's Modular Synthesis Plug-in System (PLG boards).

The ES models featured several improvements over the original MOTIFs, including twice the polyphony with faster envelopes, a DSP effects engine (up to 8 tracks in sequencer mode can use independent dual insert effects), USB mass storage support, 8x sample RAM expansion (up to 512 MB via twin DIMM modules), improved acoustic piano sound, and twice the storage amount for user sounds.

The MOTIF ES range employs "Megavoice" technology from the Yamaha Tyros2. These samples utilise 'velocity switching', designed to enable greater natural expression over the sounds, expressions such as fret noise, hammer-ons, slides and ghost notes.

=== MOTIF XS ===
- AWM2 Tone Generator
- 128 note polyphony
- 130,000 note MIDI sequencer @ 480 ppqn
- Connectors:
  - Output L/R standard phone jack
  - Assignable output standard phone jack
  - A/D input
  - Digital out (coaxial S/PDIF)
  - Phones
  - Foot controller 1,2
  - Footswitch x 2 (assignable, sustain)
  - MIDI in/out/thru
  - USB 2.0 to host, to device
  - AC In
  - Ethernet
  - mLAN (XS8 only, optional for XS6, 7)
- PCM Wave ROM: 128MB physical-ROM or "355MB (when converted to 16-bit linear format)" (aka decompressed), 2,670 waveforms
- Weighted Keys

Some improvements over the previous ES series were:

- Assignable AF1/AF2 buttons (Often defaulted to control XA)
- Larger color display
- Eight faders (four more than the ES)
- Up to eight elements (waveforms) per voice
- Expanded Articulation (XA) (e.g. being able to trigger a voice element at note-off to change the voice character)
- Ethernet connectivity
- Larger waveform ROM ("more than double compared to the MOTIF ES" - when decompressed)
- Up to 4 simultaneous arpeggios (in performance mode)
- Shipped with Cubase AI
- Direct performance recording to pattern

The MOTIF XS is not compatible with the Yamaha PLG expansion cards.

=== MOTIF XF ===
- AWM2 Tone Generator
- 128 note polyphony
- 128MB internal SDRAM (sampling memory) standard
- 130,000 note MIDI sequencer @ 480 ppqn
- Connectors:
  - Output L/R standard phone jack
  - Assignable output standard phone jack
  - A/D input
  - Digital out (coaxial S/PDIF)
  - Phones
  - Foot controller 1,2
  - Footswitch x 2 (assignable, sustain)
  - MIDI in/out/thru
  - USB 2.0 to host, to device
  - AC In
  - Ethernet
  - FW16E (optional FireWire connectivity)
  - Optional 512MB and 1024MB FLASH cards for storage of sample data (2 GB combined max)
- PCM Wave ROM: 256MB physical-ROM or "741MB (when converted to 16-bit linear format)" (aka decompressed), 3,977 waveforms
- Weighted Keys

An improvement over the MOTIF XS is the use of non-volatile flash memory for samples and sample libraries. Instead of DIMM memory modules, the XF uses proprietary flash cards. While more expensive than DIMM modules, the flash cards can permanently store sample data. The volatile DIMM modules in previous models could not store data when the unit powered off. Once initially loaded into the XF, the user doesn't have to reload sample data every time they power up the keyboard. The MOTIF XF is also the first in the MOTIF series since the MOTIF Classic to have standard internal SDRAM for sampling built into the keyboard.

As with the MOTIF XS, the MOTIF XF is not compatible with the PLG expansion cards.

Notable users of the keyboard include Stevie Wonder, Thomas Dolby, Gary Numan, Ron Mael, Billy Currie, Craig Burrows, Alan Parsons, John Foxx, George Duke and Mark Ronson.

== See also ==
- Yamaha PSR-3000
- Yamaha S90, Yamaha S90ES, Yamaha S90XS - (all use the Motif series engine)
- Yamaha MM
- Yamaha MO
