= Korg KARMA =

Music workstation

KARMA
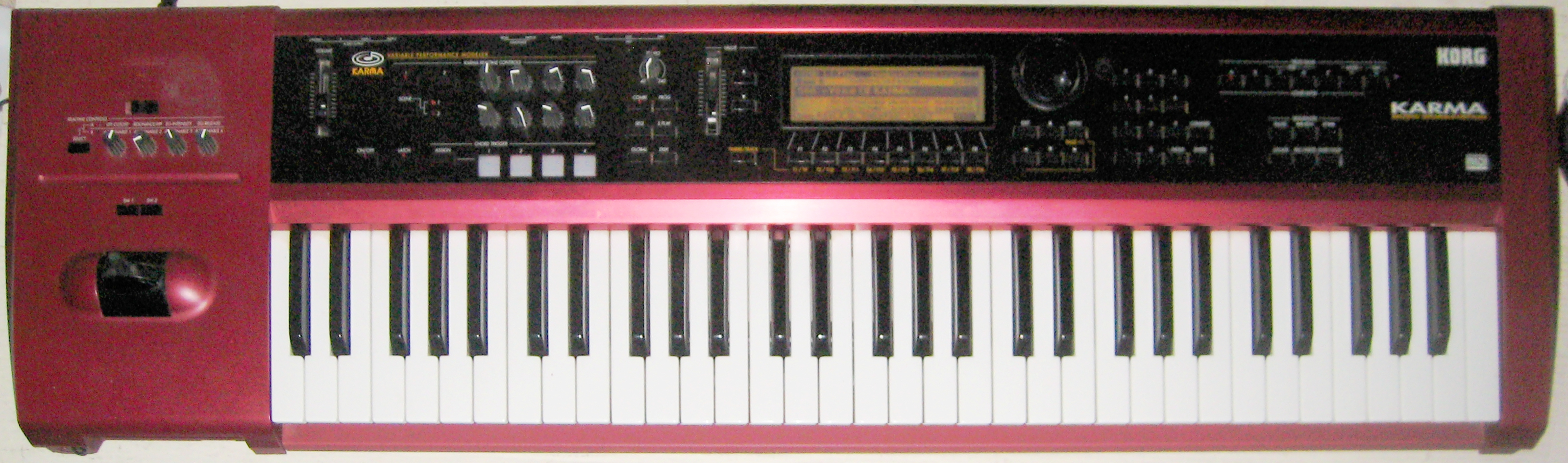
- Korg KARMA
- Manufacturer: Korg
- Dates: 2001
- Price: £1,599 GBP

Technical specifications
- Polyphony: 62 (single mode) or 31 (double mode)
- Timbrality: 8 parts (Combi mode), 16 parts (Sequencer mode)
- Oscillator: 62
- LFO: 1 (triangle, saw, square, random)
- Synthesis type: Hyper Integrated (HI)
- Filter: Resonant 24dB oct Low-pass, 12dB/oct lowpass and High-pass
- Aftertouch expression: yes
- Velocity expression: yes
- Storage memory: 32 MB ROM
- Effects: 5 insert, 2 master, EQ

Input/output
- Keyboard: 61 keys
- Left-hand control: Joystick, 4 Control Knobs, 2 Switches
- External control: MIDI

The Korg KARMA music workstation was released in 2001 as a specialised member of the Korg Triton family. KARMA stands for Kay's Algorithmic Real-time Music Architecture. The unit features up to 62 note polyphony and is 16-part multitimbral. Its sound engine is based on the Korg Triton workstation, although it has fewer features.

== Construction ==
The center section is made of brushed aluminum, and the side cheeks are constructed from plastic.

== Sequencer ==
The unit also features a 16-track sequencer with a maximum storage of 200,000 events and 200 songs

== Drum kits ==
- 413 drum sounds
- 55 drum kits
- 16 User drum kits

== Expansions ==
KORG KARMA's presets can be expanded with KORG EXB cards such as EXB-PCM01 (Pianos/Classic Keyboards), EXB-PCM02 (Studio Essentials), EXB-PCM03 (Future Loop Construction), EXB-PCM04 (Dance Extreme), EXB-PCM05 (Vintage Archives), EXB-PCM06/07 (Orchestral Collection), EXB-PCM08 (Concert Grand Piano), EXB-PCM09 (Trance Attack). Moreover, the sound engine can be extended using the valuable 6-voice DSP tone generator derived from the KORG Z1 - EXB-MOSS.

== Notable users ==
- Rick Wakeman
- Phil Collins
- Herbie Hancock
- Peter Gabriel
- Vangelis
- Yes
- Pete Townshend
- Keith Emerson
- Jean-Michel Jarre
- Tuomas Holopainen
- Jordan Rudess
- Mark Kelly
