= Roland Fantom-X =

Synthesizer

- Manufacturer: Roland
- Dates: 2004 - 2008
- Price: X6 £1599 GBP; X7 £1999 GBP; X8 £2299 GBP

Technical specifications
- Polyphony: 128 voices
- Timbrality: 16
- Oscillator: n/a
- LFO: 2
- Synthesis type: Digital sample-based synthesis
- Filter: 1 per tone (4 tones per patch)
- Attenuator: 1
- Aftertouch expression: Yes
- Velocity expression: Yes
- Storage memory: 32MB + DIMM slot expandable up to 512MB
- Effects: 78

Input/output
- Keyboard: 61/76/88 keys
- External control: USB and MIDI

The Fantom-X (Xa/X6/X7/X8/XR) was a music workstation/synthesizer in the Roland Fantom line, produced by Roland Corporation. It was introduced in 2004 as an upgrade from the Fantom S series. The Fantom-X competes with the Korg Triton/Triton Extreme, the Yamaha Motif and other similar large-scope keyboards such as the discontinued Alesis Fusion. In 2008 it was succeeded by the Fantom-G*, which was devised to compete with the new Korg and Yamaha flagship keyboards.

== Features ==
The Roland Fantom-X features a 128-voice PCM-based synthesizer, a 16-track MRC-Pro sequencer, 6 effects processors, dynamic pads and infrared D-Beam, a stereo sampler and full on-screen editing. The Fantom X received an audio recorder upgrade with version 2.00 that allows for 8 stereo audio tracks integrated with the internal MIDI sequencer.

- The Fantom X6 - 61-key version with aftertouch
- The Fantom X7 - 76-key version with aftertouch
- The Fantom X8 - 88-key fully weighted piano keyboard with aftertouch
- The Fantom XR - (rackmount module version) accepts up to six SRX expansion boards.
- The Fantom Xa - Newer model with a smaller screen. Has multiple I/O, microphone inputs, multisampling and 128-note polyphony.

All Fantom X series, except for Xa, accept up to four SRX-series wave expansion boards. Total of 12 different SRX boards were produced.

== Models ==
There are five models in the Fantom-X family:

- X6: 61 keys - velocity and aftertouch.
- X7: 76 keys - velocity and aftertouch.
- X8: 88 weighted, hammer-action keys with aftertouch.
- XR: Rack-mounted sound module holds up to six SRX expansion boards but does not feature a sequencer.
- Xa: 61 keys - velocity only.

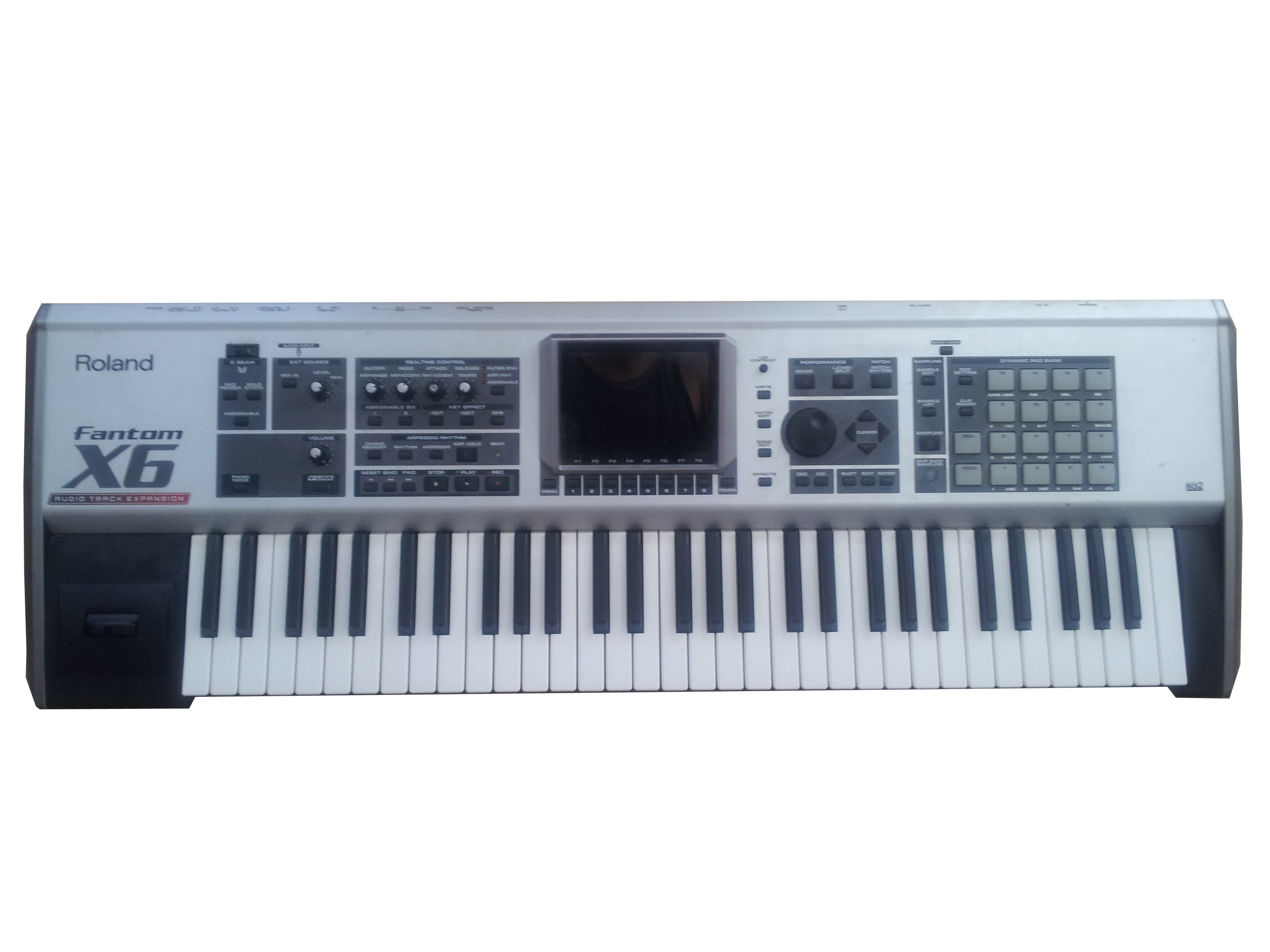
Roland Fantom X6 Top View

The X6, X7, and X8, apart from their keyboards, are almost identical in the controls they offer, the internal software they run, and the expansions they accept.

In 2005 the 61-key Fantom-Xa was released. The Xa still uses waveforms based on the S series, having similar patches to the Juno G, hence not the current pianos, brass, and other patches available in the new X series. The Xa comes with a smaller mpc style graphical green screen, the keyboard is the same model used on Fantom X6 and 7, but does not have the weights as in the flagship, and lacks aftertouch.

== Successors ==
After the Fantom-X, Roland produced its successor, the Fantom-G, which included twice the waveform memory, more patches, 128 voice polyphony, advanced and easy to use sequencer. Fantom-G accepts new ARX wave expansion cards, has larger full-color screen, 16 insert effects per patch and other improvements. A partial follow up to the Roland Fantom-X is the Integra-7 sound module. It does not have sequencer, sampler or other functions, however it does contain the waveforms of all SRX boards at a time.

In 2019, Roland released the Fantom 6/7/8 series workstation which includes multiple synth engines, following the footsteps of Korg Kronos and Yamaha Montage.

The full lineage is listed at the Roland Fantom page.
