= Yamaha S90 =

Synthesizer

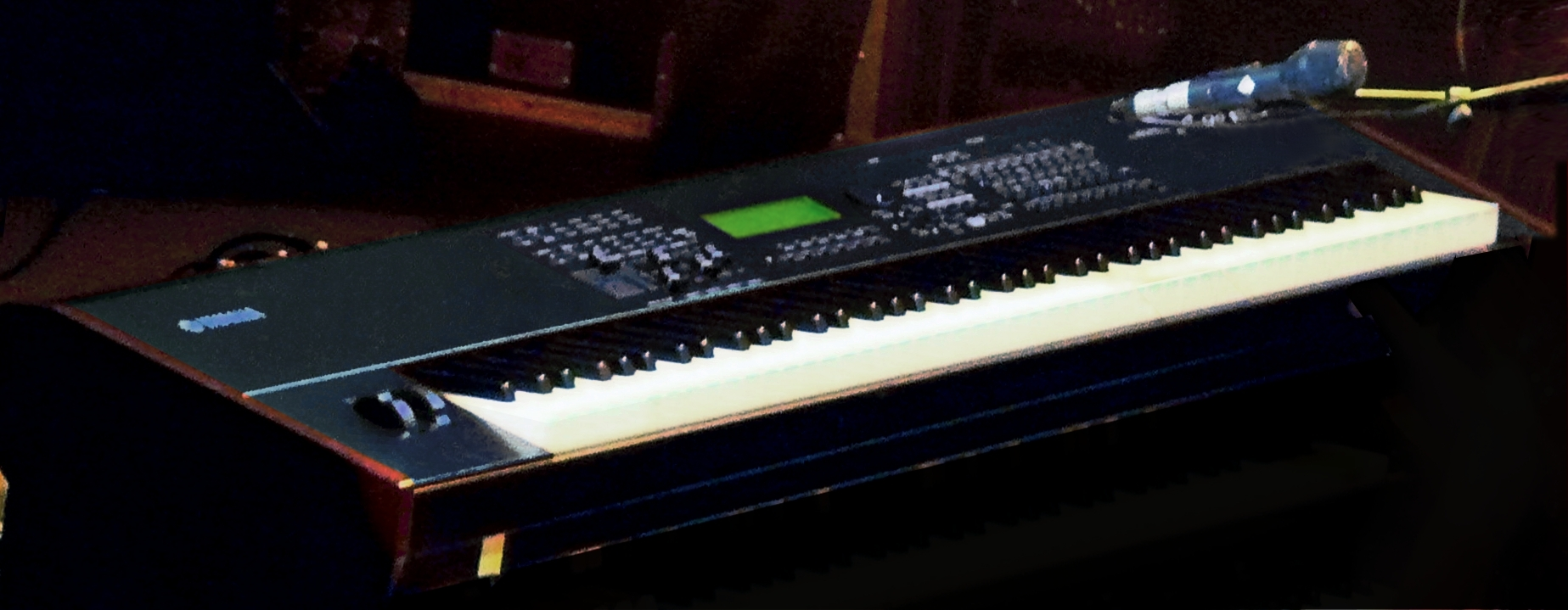
- Yamaha S90 ES on stage
- Manufacturer: Yamaha

Technical specifications
- Polyphony: 128 notes
- Timbrality: 16 parts
- Oscillator: 2 772 waveforms
- LFO: 1
- Synthesis type: AWM2 technology and Expanded Joint function
- Filter: 18filter types
- Effects: reverb, chorus, vocoder, 5-band EQ

Input/output
- Keyboard: 88 keys
- External control: MIDI in, out, thru, USB

The Yamaha Music Synthesizer S90 is a synthesizer and a MIDI controller in one unit, released in 2002 to supersede the S80. As such, it is part of the S series together with the S03 and S08. It was superseded by the S90ES in 2005, itself superseded by the S90XS in 2009.

== Overall features ==
=== Keyboard ===
The S90 provides 88 fully weighted keys, the number equivalent to a standard piano, emulating the pianistic mechanism. The keyboard naturally provides initial touch, but also aftertouch response and has a 64-note polyphony with 16 multitimbral parts providing a maximum of 4 performance parts.

=== Presets ===
There are 384 normal (e.g. instrumental) presets and 48 drum kits. The S90 also includes standard GM presets. User presets are 128 normal and 16 drum kits. Presets may be expanded through up to three plug-in boards allowing a bank of 64 presets for each plug-in slot.

=== Expandability and memory slot ===
The S90 can be expanded through plug-in boards at three plug-in slots, thus providing additional presets, polyphony, effects and synthesizer functionality. Also, a memory slot is included for SmartMedia (3.3 V) cards up to 128 MB.

== Physical appearance ==
=== Visual description ===
The S90 is a large black synthesizer with brown side panels and a green display. 71 push buttons are distributed across the front panel, save for the power switch on the back. Pitch bend and modulation wheels are placed above the keyboard aligned to the left.

=== Measurements ===
Metric (SI)
Dimensions (mm): 1,357 (W) × 386 (D) × 163 (H)
Weight (kg): 23.0

Imperial, English, United States customary, etc.
Weight (lbs.): 51
Dimensions (inches): 53 3 /8" (W) × 15 1 /8" (D) × 6 3 /8" (H)

=== Panels and connectors ===
Front Panel
The front panel features a standard setup of a pitch bend wheel, a modulation wheel and a master volume slider. In addition there are four assignable control sliders and one 'rotary encoder'. The display is a 240 × 64 dot graphic backlit LCD.

Back Panel
Output: L/mono, R (1 /4" Jacks)
Assignable output: L, R (1 /4" Jacks)
Master Equalizer (5 bands)
Phones (Stereo 1 /4" Jack)
2 × Foot controller
2 × Foot switch: Assignable, Sustain
Breath
MIDI IN
MIDI OUT
MIDI THRU
USB
ACINLET

== Sound generation and effects ==
The synthesizer uses AWM2, a "Modular Synthesis Plug-in System" and 21 types of filter. Table 1 shows an overview of the S90 factory effects.

Table 1. List of Onboard effects

Effect Name	Factor	No. of Types
Reverb	?	12
Chorus	?	25
Insertion	1 x	25
Insertion	2 x	104
Variation¹	2 x	25
Equalizer	(master)	(5 bands)

¹ available for Performance/Song mode
