= Yamaha S80 =

S80
- Manufacturer: Yamaha Corporation
- Dates: 1999–2002
- Price: US $3,000; UK £1,399

Technical specifications
- Polyphony: 64 voices
- Timbrality: 19 parts across 16 MIDI channels
- Oscillator: 479 waveforms
- LFO: tri, tri up, saw up, saw dw, sq1/4, sq1/3, sq, sq2/3, sq 3/4, trpzd, S/H1, S/H2
- Synthesis type: AWM2 synthesis
- Filter: Band-Pass, Hi-pass, Low-pass, BPF wide, BEF 6.
- Aftertouch expression: Yes
- Velocity expression: Yes
- Storage memory: 384 voice memories 64 voices with each plug-in board
- Effects: Reverb, chorus and delay

Input/output
- Keyboard: 88 weighted keys
- Left-hand control: 4 assignable sliders
- External control: Midi In, Out, Through + PC/ Mac Serial

The Yamaha S80 is an 88-weighted-key synthesizer, produced by Yamaha Corporation.

It was released as Yamaha's flagship stage and studio synthesizer in 1999, and retailed for approximately US $3,000 before its discontinuation in 2002. It was superseded by the S90. The S80 is 1,330 millimetres (52 in) long, 157 millimetres (6.2 in) high, and 371 millimetres (14.6 in) deep, and weighs 24.3 kg (54 lb).

The tone generation module of the S30/S80 utilizes Yamaha's Advanced Wave Memory 2 algorithm (AWM2), providing 256 built-in voices and eight drum kits with a polyphony of 64 voices.

== Notable users ==
- Faithless
- Sparks
