= Music workstation =

Device for composing electronic music

A music workstation is an electronic musical instrument providing the facilities of:

- a sound module,
- a music sequencer and
- (usually) a musical keyboard.

It enables a musician to compose electronic music using just one piece of equipment.

== Origin of concept ==
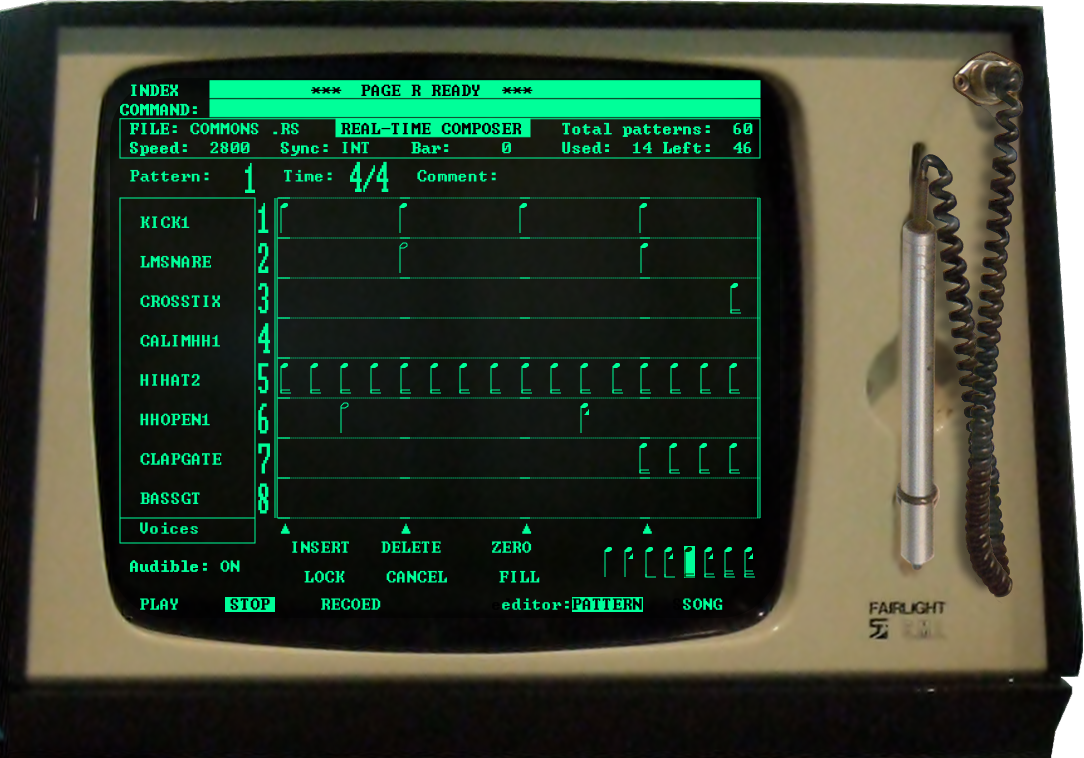
"Page R" pattern editing software on Fairlight CMI Series II (1982) realized the interactive composition of music using sampling sound.

The concept of a music sequencer combined with a synthesizer originated in the late 1970s with the combination of microprocessors, mini-computers, digital synthesis, disk-based storage, and control devices such as musical keyboards becoming feasible to combine into a single piece of equipment that was affordable to high-end studios and producers, as well as being portable for performers. Prior to this, the integration between sequencing and synthesis was generally a manual function based on wiring of components in large modular synthesizers, and the storage of notes was simply based on potentiometer settings in an analog sequencer.

=== Multitimbrality ===
Polyphonic synthesizers such as Sequential Circuit Prophet-5 and Yamaha DX7 were capable of playing only one patch at a time (the DX7II could play 2 patches on 2 separate MIDI channels) There was some sequencing ability in some keyboards, but it was not MIDI sequencing.

In the mid to late 80s, workstation synths were manufactured more than single-patch keyboards. A workstation such as the Korg M1 was able to play out 8 different patches on 8 different MIDI channels, as well as playing a drum track, and had an onboard MIDI sequencer. The patches were often samples, but users could not record their own samples, as they could on a Fairlight. Having samples as the sound source is what made it possible to have various drum sounds in one patch. In contrast, a DX7 or a JX3P did not have the synthesis features to create all the sounds in a drum kit.

== First generation music workstations ==
Examples of early music workstations included the New England Digital Synclavier and the Fairlight CMI.

=== Key technologies for the first generation ===
Low-cost computer hardware
Leveraging the technology of personal computers, adding a microprocessor enabled complex control functions to be expressed in software rather than wiring. In 1977, the Sequential Circuits Prophet-5 and other polyphonic synthesizers had used microprocessors to control patch storage and recall, and the music workstations applied it to control sequence storage and recall as well. The Fairlight used a dual Motorola 6800 configuration, while the Synclavier used a mini-computer called the ABLE.

Digital synthesis
While it was possible to create a music workstation with digitally controlled analog synthesis modules, few companies did this, instead seeking to produce new sounds and capabilities based on digital synthesis (early units were based on FM synthesis or sample playback).

Disk-based storage
Again leveraging the technology of personal computers, music workstations used floppy disks to record patches, sequences, and samples. Hard disk storage appeared in the second generation.

Control devices
In a music workstation, the keyboard was not directly connected to the synthesis modules, as in a Minimoog or ARP Odyssey. Instead, the keyboard switches were digitally scanned, and control signals sent over a computer backplane where they were inputs to the computer processor, which would then route the signals to the synthesis modules, which were output devices on the backplane. This approach had been used for years in computer systems, and allowed the addition of new input and output peripherals without obsoleting the entire computer. In the case of the music workstations, the next output devices to be added were typically computer terminal displays (some with graphics), and in the case of the Fairlight, the next input device was a light pen for "drawing" on the display screen.

The result was that music workstations evolved rapidly during this period, as new software releases could add more functionality, new voice cards developed, and new input technologies added.

== Second generation music workstations ==
By 1982, the Fairlight CMI Series II represented another advance as it now offered more RAM-based sample memory than any other system with an improved sample rate, and in the Series III (1985) changed from 8-bit to 16-bit samples. The Synclavier introduced hard-disk based sampling in 1982, storing megabytes of samples for the first time.

Other products also combined synthesis and sequencing. For instance the Sequential Circuits Six-Trak provided this possibility. The Six-Trak was a polyphonic analog synthesizer, which featured an on-board six-track sequencer.

Still other products focused on combining sampling and sequencing. For instance the E-mu Emulator models, first introduced in 1981, combined sample memory (read from floppy disks) with a simple sequencer in the initial model, and an 8-track sequencer in later models.

The biggest change in the industry was the development of the MIDI standard in 1983 for representing musical note sequences. For the first time, sequences could be moved from one digitally controlled music device to another.

The Ensoniq ESQ-1, released in 1985, combined for the first time a multi-track, polyphonic MIDI sequencer with a dynamically-assigned multi-timbral synthesizer.

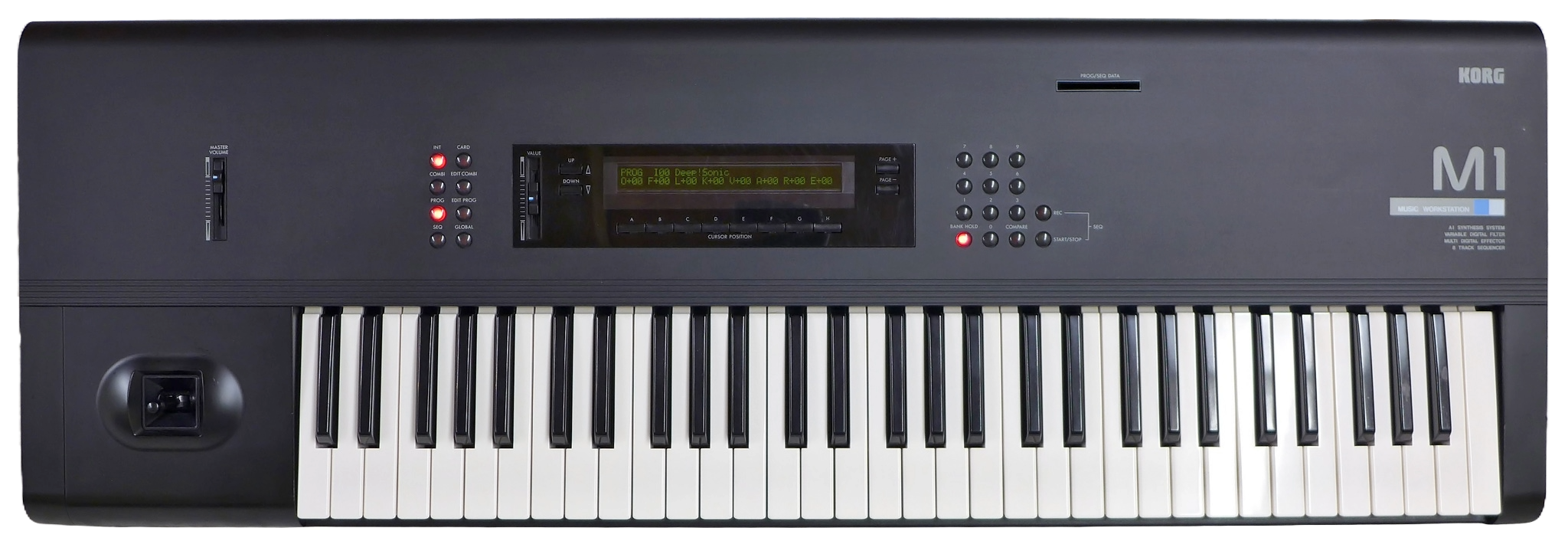
Korg M1 (1988–1990s)

In the late 1980s, on-board MIDI sequencers began to appear more frequently on professional synthesizers. The Korg M1 (released 1988) a widely known and popular music workstation, and became the world's best-selling digital keyboard synthesizer of all time. During its six-year production period, more than 250,000 units were sold.

=== Key technologies for the second generation ===
MIDI
As mentioned above, MIDI data represents pitches, velocities, and controller events (e.g. pitch bend, modulation wheel). MIDI information could be used on the backplane that linked the elements of the workstation together, connecting the input devices to the synthesizers, or it could be sent to another device or received from another device.

Display technologies
Music workstations adopted the most effective input/output devices available for their price range, since there were complex control settings to display, complex waveforms, and complex sequences. The lower-end devices began to use LED displays that showed multiple lines of characters and later simple graphics, while the higher-end devices began to adopt personal computers with graphics as their front-ends (the Synclavier PostPro used an Apple Macintosh).

Large memory banks
Music workstations soon had megabytes of memory, located on large racks of cards.

Modular software
Music workstations had software that was organized around a set of common control functions, and then a set of options. In many cases, these options were organized as 'pages'. The Fairlight was known for its "Page R" functions which provided real-time composition in a graphical form which was similar to that later used on drum machines such as the Roland TR-808. The Synclavier offered music notation.

Digital signal processing
This enabled the music workstation to generate effects such as reverb or chorus within its hardware, rather than relying on external devices.

SMPTE
Since the primary users of the high-end workstations were film composers, the music workstations added hardware and software to generate SMPTE timecode, which is a standard in the motion picture industry. This allowed one to generate events that were matched to scenes and cuts in the film.

== Third generation music workstations ==
Although many music workstations have a keyboard, this is not always the case. In the 1990s, Yamaha and Roland released a series of portable music workstations (starting with the Yamaha QY10 (1990)). These are sometimes called walkstations.

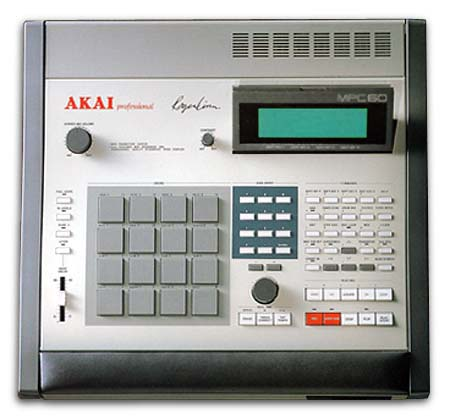
Akai MPC60 (1988)

The concept of the workstation evolved in the mid-1990s with the emergence of the groove machine concept that began in the mid-1980s – a keyless version of a workstation, still with a self-contained sound source and sequencer, mostly intended for dance music. Nowadays, these devices feature a sampler. The groove machines that emerged in the mid-1980s include the Linn 9000 (1984), SCI Studio 440 (1986), Korg DDD-1 (1986), Yamaha RX5 (1986), Simmons SDX (1987)), Kawai R-50e (1987), E-mu SP-12/SP-1200 (1985/1987), and Akai MPC60 (1988). In the mid-1990s, Roland entered the market with the MC-303 (1996), and Korg and Yamaha re-entered the market, Korg with the Electribe series (1999–).

Akai developed and refined the idea of the keyboard-less workstation with the Music Production Center series (1988–) of sampler workstations. The MPC breed of sampler freed the composer from the rigidity of step sequencing, which was a limitation of earlier groove machines.

=== Key technologies for the third generation ===
Low-cost, high-capacity memory
By 1995, a music workstation might have 16 to 64 megabytes of memory in a few chips, which had required a rack of cards in 1985.

Sample libraries
While a second-generation workstation could be sold with just a few sounds or samples and the ability for the owner to create more, by 1995 most workstations had several additional sample sets available for purchase on ROM, and an industry had been created for third-party sample libraries. In addition, there were now standard formats for sound samples to achieve interoperability.

Battery power
Since music workstations were now used by wide range of performers, down to individual dance music DJ's and even street performers, portable designs avoided power-intensive components such as disk storage and began to rely on persistent memory and later flash-memory storage.

Interoperability with personal computers
Initially through custom interfaces and later USB standards.

== Modern music workstations ==
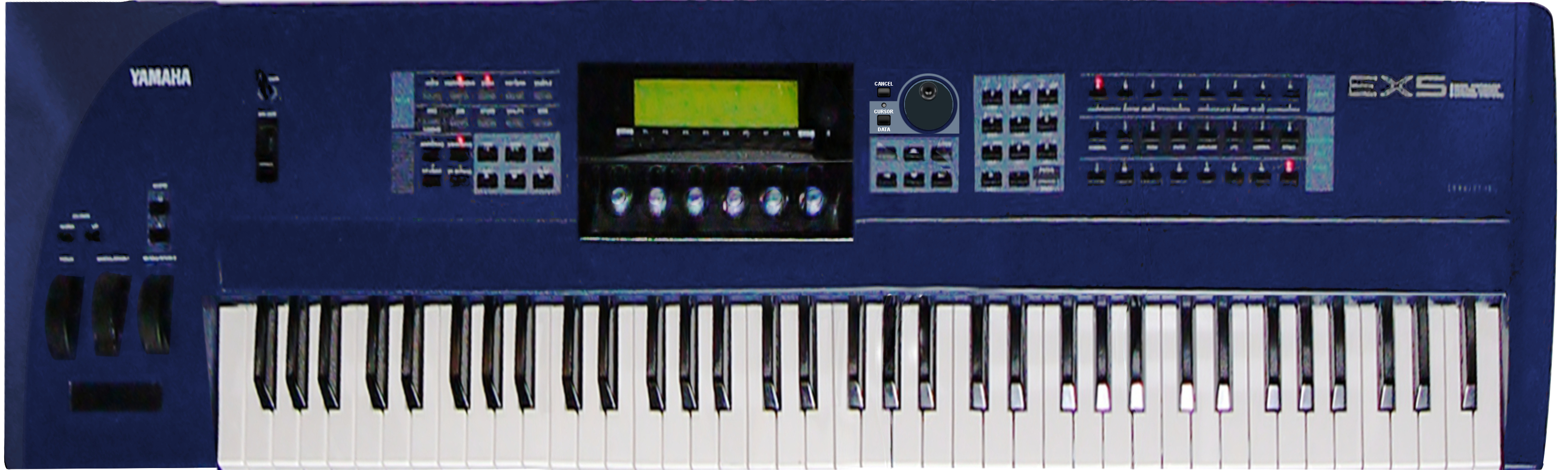
Yamaha EX5 (1998–2000) supports multiple-synthesis algorithms including sampling.

Yamaha, Roland and Korg now have sampling as a default option with the Yamaha Motif line (introduced 2001), the Roland Fantom series (introduced 2001) and the Korg Triton (introduced 1999), Korg OASYS, and Korg M3 Workstations have a fairly large screen to give a comprehensive overview of the sound, sequencer and sampling options. Since the display is one of the most expensive components of these workstations, Roland and Yamaha initially chose to keep costs down by not using a touch screen or high-resolution display, but have added such in later models.

Another path of music product development that started with the feature set of music workstations is to provide entirely software-based products, using virtual instruments. This is the concept of the digital audio workstation, and many of these products have emulated the multitrack recording metaphors of sequencers first developed in the music workstations.

Open Labs introduced the Production Station in 2003, which changed the relationship of the music workstation and the personal computer from a model where the music workstation interfaces to the PC into one where the music workstation is a PC with a music keyboard and a touch screen display.

A variation on Open Labs' approach, Korg released the Korg OASYS in 2005. OASYS housed inside a keyboard music workstation housing a computer running a custom operating system built on the Linux kernel. OASYS was an acronym for Open Architecture SYnthesis Studio, underscoring Korg's ability to release new capabilities via ongoing software updates. OASYS not only included a synthesizer, sampling, and a sequencer, but the ability to digitally record multi-track audio. OASYS was discontinued in 2009, and Korg Kronos, an updated version built on the same concept, was introduced in January, 2011.

== Evaluation of a music workstation ==
While advances in digital technology have greatly reduced the price of a professional-grade music workstation, the 'time cost' of learning to operate a complex instrument like this cannot be underestimated. Hence, product selection is critical, and is typically based upon:

- Ease of use
- Number of tracks in the sequencer
- Expansion options and modularity
- Size of user and support community
- Support for standards such as MIDI, SMPTE, Internet, etc.
- Reliable functioning
- Adaptation to most requirements of music production.
