= Additive synthesis =

Sound synthesis technique

Additive synthesis example
A bell-like sound generated by additive synthesis of 21 inharmonic partials

Additive synthesis is a sound synthesis technique that creates timbre by adding sine waves together.

The timbre of musical instruments can be considered in the light of Fourier theory to consist of multiple harmonic or inharmonic partials or overtones. Each partial is a sine wave of different frequency and amplitude that swells and decays over time due to modulation from a four parameter attack, decay, sustain and release envelope (ADSR envelope) or low-frequency oscillator.

Additive synthesis most directly generates sound by adding the output of multiple sine wave generators. Alternative implementations may use pre-computed wavetables or the inverse fast Fourier transform.

== Explanation ==
The sounds heard in everyday life are not characterized by a single frequency. Instead, they consist of a sum of pure sine frequencies, each one at a different amplitude. When humans hear these frequencies simultaneously, we can recognize the sound. This is true for both non-musical sounds (e.g. water splashing, leaves rustling) and for musical sounds (e.g. a piano note, a bird's tweet). This set of parameters (frequencies, their relative amplitudes, and how the relative amplitudes change over time) are encapsulated by the timbre of the sound. Fourier analysis is the technique that is used to determine these exact timbre parameters from an overall sound signal; conversely, the resulting set of frequencies and amplitudes is called the Fourier series of the original sound signal.

Sounds can be broadly classified as either harmonic or inharmonic. In the case of harmonic sounds, the lowest frequency of the sound is called the fundamental frequency. The set of the remaining frequencies is called the overtones of the sound. The overtones of a piano playing middle C will be different from the overtones of a violin playing the same note; that's what allows us to differentiate the sounds of the two instruments. There are even subtle differences in timbre between different versions of the same instrument such as an upright piano vs. a grand piano.

Additive synthesis aims to exploit this property of sound in order to construct timbre from the ground up. By adding together pure frequencies (sine waves) of varying frequencies and amplitudes, and modulating these throughout time, we can construct the timbre of the sound that we want to create.

== Definitions ==
Schematic diagram of additive synthesis. The inputs to the oscillators are frequencies $f_k$ and amplitudes $r_k$.

Harmonic additive synthesis is closely related to the concept of a Fourier series which is a way of expressing a periodic function as the sum of sinusoidal functions with frequencies equal to integer multiples of a common fundamental frequency. These sinusoids are called harmonics, overtones, or generally, partials. In general, a Fourier series contains an infinite number of sinusoidal components, with no upper limit to the frequency of the sinusoidal functions and includes a DC component (one with frequency of 0 Hz). Frequencies outside of the human audible range can be omitted in additive synthesis. As a result, only a finite number of sinusoidal terms with frequencies that lie within the audible range are modeled in additive synthesis.

A waveform or function is said to be periodic if

$$y(t) = y(t+P)$$

for all $t$ and for some period $P$.

The Fourier series of a periodic function is mathematically expressed as:

$$\begin{align}
y(t) &= \frac{a_0}{2} + \sum_{k=1}^{\infty} \left[ a_k \cos(2 \pi k f_0 t ) - b_k \sin(2 \pi k f_0 t ) \right] \\
&= \frac{a_0}{2} + \sum_{k=1}^{\infty} r_k \cos\left(2 \pi k f_0 t + \phi_k \right) \\
\end{align}$$

where

- $f_0 = 1/P$ is the fundamental frequency of the waveform and is equal to the reciprocal of the period,
- $a_k = r_k \cos(\phi_k) = 2 f_0 \int_{0}^P y(t) \cos(2 \pi k f_0 t)\, dt, \quad k \ge 0$
- $b_k = r_k \sin(\phi_k) = -2 f_0 \int_{0}^P y(t) \sin(2 \pi k f_0 t)\, dt, \quad k \ge 1$
- $r_k = \sqrt{a_k^2 + b_k^2}$ is the amplitude of the $k$th harmonic,
- $\phi_k = \operatorname{atan2}(b_k, a_k)$ is the phase offset of the $k$th harmonic. atan2 is the four-quadrant arctangent function,

Being inaudible, the DC component, $a_0/2$, and all components with frequencies higher than some finite limit, $K f_0$, are omitted in the following expressions of additive synthesis.

=== Harmonic form ===
The simplest harmonic additive synthesis can be mathematically expressed as:

$y(t) = \sum_{k=1}^{K} r_k \cos\left(2 \pi k f_0 t + \phi_k \right),$	1

where $y(t)$ is the synthesis output, $r_k$, $k f_0$, and $\phi_k$ are the amplitude, frequency, and the phase offset, respectively, of the $k$th harmonic partial of a total of $K$ harmonic partials, and $f_0$ is the fundamental frequency of the waveform and the frequency of the musical note.

=== Time-dependent amplitudes ===
Example of harmonic additive synthesis in which each harmonic has a time-dependent amplitude. The fundamental frequency is 440 Hz. Problems listening to this file? See Media help

More generally, the amplitude of each harmonic can be prescribed as a function of time, $r_k(t)$, in which case the synthesis output is

$y(t) = \sum_{k=1}^{K} r_k(t) \cos\left(2 \pi k f_0 t + \phi_k \right)$.	2

Each envelope $r_k(t)\,$ should vary slowly relative to the frequency spacing between adjacent sinusoids. The bandwidth of $r_k(t)$ should be significantly less than $f_0$.

=== Inharmonic form ===
Additive synthesis can also produce inharmonic sounds (which are aperiodic waveforms) in which the individual overtones need not have frequencies that are integer multiples of some common fundamental frequency. While many conventional musical instruments have harmonic partials (e.g. an oboe), some have inharmonic partials (e.g. bells). Inharmonic additive synthesis can be described as

$$y(t) = \sum_{k=1}^{K} r_k(t) \cos\left(2 \pi f_k t + \phi_k \right),$$

where $f_k$ is the constant frequency of $k$th partial.

Example of inharmonic additive synthesis in which both the amplitude and frequency of each partial are time-dependent. Problems listening to this file? See Media help

=== Time-dependent frequencies ===
In the general case, the instantaneous frequency of a sinusoid is the derivative (with respect to time) of the argument of the sine or cosine function. If this frequency is represented in hertz, rather than in angular frequency form, then this derivative is divided by $2 \pi$. This is the case whether the partial is harmonic or inharmonic and whether its frequency is constant or time-varying.

In the most general form, the frequency of each non-harmonic partial is a non-negative function of time, $f_k(t)$, yielding

$y(t) = \sum_{k=1}^{K} r_k(t) \cos\left(2 \pi \int_0^t f_k(u)\ du + \phi_k \right).$	3

=== Broader definitions ===
Additive synthesis more broadly may mean sound synthesis techniques that sum simple elements to create more complex timbres, even when the elements are not sine waves. For example, F. Richard Moore listed additive synthesis as one of the "four basic categories" of sound synthesis alongside subtractive synthesis, nonlinear synthesis, and physical modeling. In this broad sense, pipe organs, which also have pipes producing non-sinusoidal waveforms, can be considered as a variant form of additive synthesizers. Summation of principal components and Walsh functions have also been classified as additive synthesis.

== Implementation methods ==
Modern-day implementations of additive synthesis are mainly digital. (See section Discrete-time equations for the underlying discrete-time theory)

=== Oscillator bank synthesis ===
Additive synthesis can be implemented using a bank of sinusoidal oscillators, one for each partial.

=== Wavetable synthesis ===
In the case of harmonic, quasi-periodic musical tones, wavetable synthesis can be as general as time-varying additive synthesis, but requires less computation during synthesis. As a result, an efficient implementation of time-varying additive synthesis of harmonic tones can be accomplished by use of wavetable synthesis.

==== Group additive synthesis ====
Group additive synthesis is a method to group partials into harmonic groups (having different fundamental frequencies) and synthesize each group separately with wavetable synthesis before mixing the results.

=== Inverse FFT synthesis ===
An inverse fast Fourier transform can be used to efficiently synthesize frequencies that evenly divide the transform period or "frame". By careful consideration of the DFT frequency-domain representation it is also possible to efficiently synthesize sinusoids of arbitrary frequencies using a series of overlapping frames and the inverse fast Fourier transform.

== Additive analysis/resynthesis ==
Sinusoidal analysis/synthesis system for Sinusoidal Modeling (based on McAulay & Quatieri 1988, p. 161)

It is possible to analyze the frequency components of a recorded sound giving a "sum of sinusoids" representation. This representation can be re-synthesized using additive synthesis. One method of decomposing a sound into time varying sinusoidal partials is short-time Fourier transform (STFT)-based McAulay-Quatieri Analysis.

By modifying the sum of sinusoids representation, timbral alterations can be made prior to resynthesis. For example, a harmonic sound could be restructured to sound inharmonic, and vice versa. Sound hybridisation or "morphing" has been implemented by additive resynthesis.

Additive analysis/resynthesis has been employed in a number of techniques including Sinusoidal Modelling, Spectral Modelling Synthesis (SMS), and the Reassigned Bandwidth-Enhanced Additive Sound Model. Software that implements additive analysis/resynthesis includes: SPEAR, LEMUR, LORIS, SMSTools, ARSS.

=== Products ===
Additive re-synthesis using timbre-frame concatenation:

Concatenation with crossfades (on Synclavier)

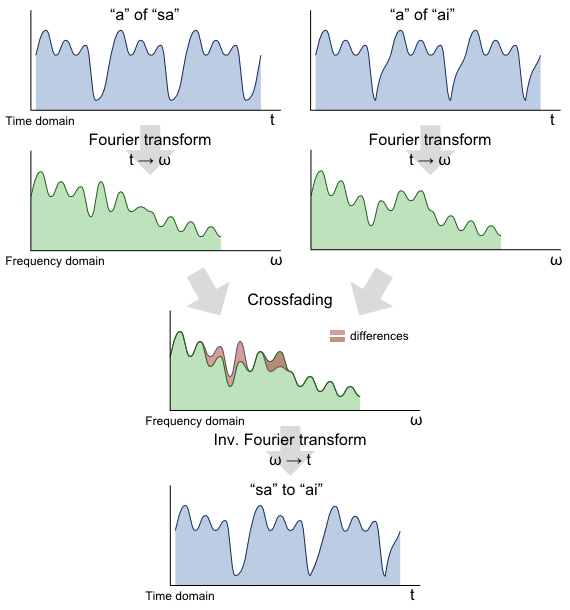
Concatenation with spectral envelope interpolation (on Vocaloid)

New England Digital Synclavier had a resynthesis feature where samples could be analyzed and converted into "timbre frames" which were part of its additive synthesis engine. Technos Acxel, launched in 1987, utilized the additive analysis/resynthesis model, in an FFT implementation.

Also a vocal synthesizer, Vocaloid have been implemented on the basis of additive analysis/resynthesis: its spectral voice model called Excitation plus Resonances (EpR) model is extended based on Spectral Modeling Synthesis (SMS), and its diphone concatenative synthesis is processed using spectral peak processing (SPP) technique similar to modified phase-locked vocoder (an improved phase vocoder for formant processing). Using these techniques, spectral components (formants) consisting of purely harmonic partials can be appropriately transformed into desired form for sound modeling, and sequence of short samples (diphones or phonemes) constituting desired phrase, can be smoothly connected by interpolating matched partials and formant peaks, respectively, in the inserted transition region between different samples. (See also Dynamic timbres)

== Applications ==
=== Musical instruments ===
Additive synthesis is used in electronic musical instruments. It is the principal sound generation technique used by Eminent organs.

=== Speech synthesis ===
In linguistics research, harmonic additive synthesis was used in the 1950s to play back modified and synthetic speech spectrograms.

Later, in the early 1980s, listening tests were carried out on synthetic speech stripped of acoustic cues to assess their significance. Time-varying formant frequencies and amplitudes derived by linear predictive coding were synthesized additively as pure tone whistles. This method is called sinewave synthesis. Also the composite sinusoidal modeling (CSM) used on a singing speech synthesis feature on the Yamaha CX5M (1984), is known to use a similar approach which was independently developed during 1966–1979. These methods are characterized by extraction and recomposition of a set of significant spectral peaks corresponding to the several resonance modes occurring in the oral cavity and nasal cavity, in a viewpoint of acoustics. This principle was also utilized on a physical modeling synthesis method, called modal synthesis.

== History ==
Lord Kelvin's Tide-predicting machine

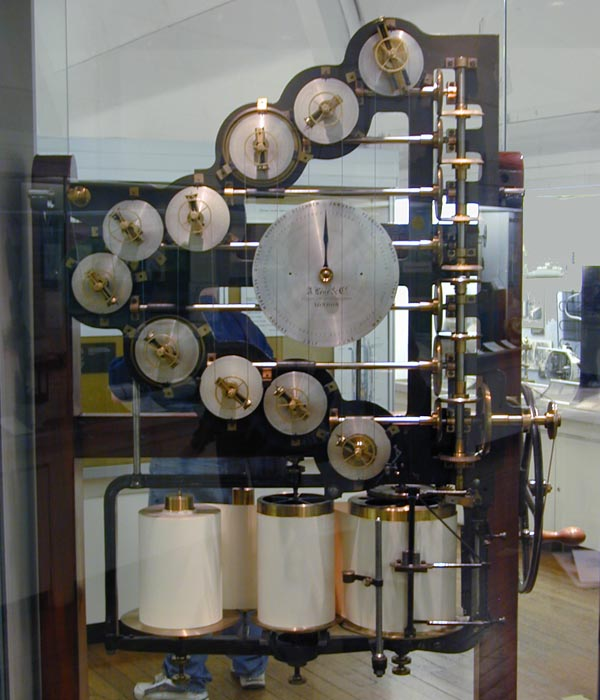
Harmonic synthesizer

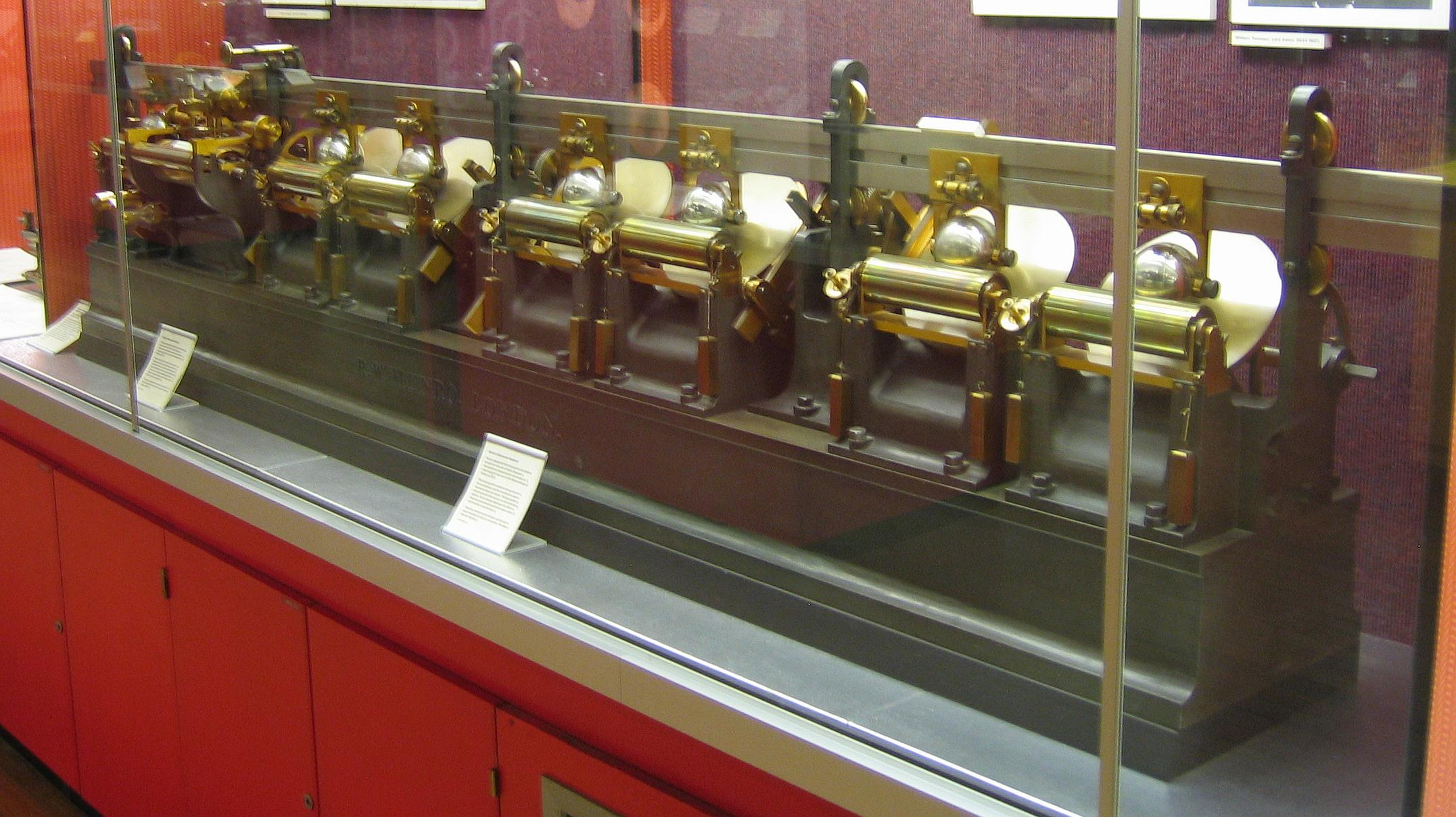
Harmonic analyzer

Harmonic analysis was discovered by Joseph Fourier, who published an extensive treatise of his research in the context of heat transfer in 1822. The theory found an early application in prediction of tides. Around 1876, William Thomson (later ennobled as Lord Kelvin) constructed a mechanical tide predictor. It consisted of a harmonic analyzer and a harmonic synthesizer, as they were called already in the 19th century. The analysis of tide measurements was done using James Thomson's integrating machine. The resulting Fourier coefficients were input into the synthesizer, which then used a system of cords and pulleys to generate and sum harmonic sinusoidal partials for prediction of future tides. In 1910, a similar machine was built for the analysis of periodic waveforms of sound. The synthesizer drew a graph of the combination waveform, which was used chiefly for visual validation of the analysis.

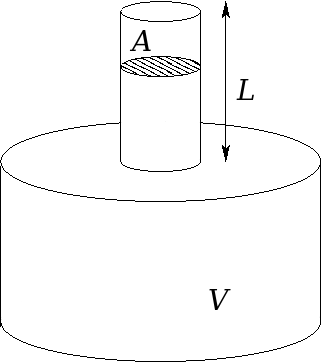
Helmholtz resonator

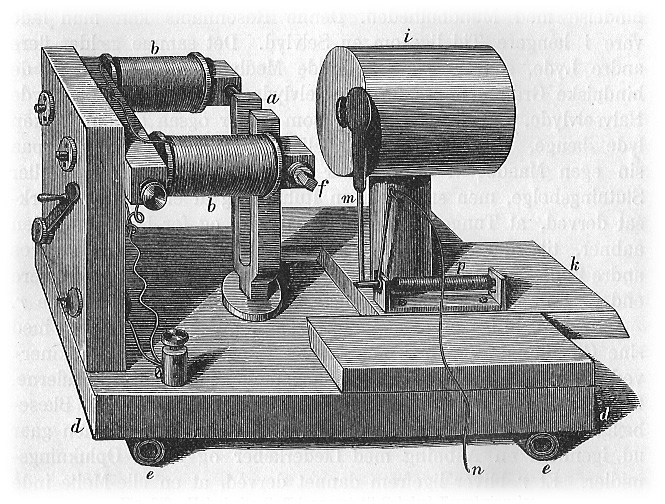
Tone-generator utilizing it

Georg Ohm applied Fourier's theory to sound in 1843. The line of work was greatly advanced by Hermann von Helmholtz, who published his eight years worth of research in 1863. Helmholtz believed that the psychological perception of tone color is subject to learning, while hearing in the sensory sense is purely physiological. He supported the idea that perception of sound derives from signals from nerve cells of the basilar membrane and that the elastic appendages of these cells are sympathetically vibrated by pure sinusoidal tones of appropriate frequencies. Helmholtz agreed with the finding of Ernst Chladni from 1787 that certain sound sources have inharmonic vibration modes.

Rudolph Koenig's sound analyzer and synthesizer

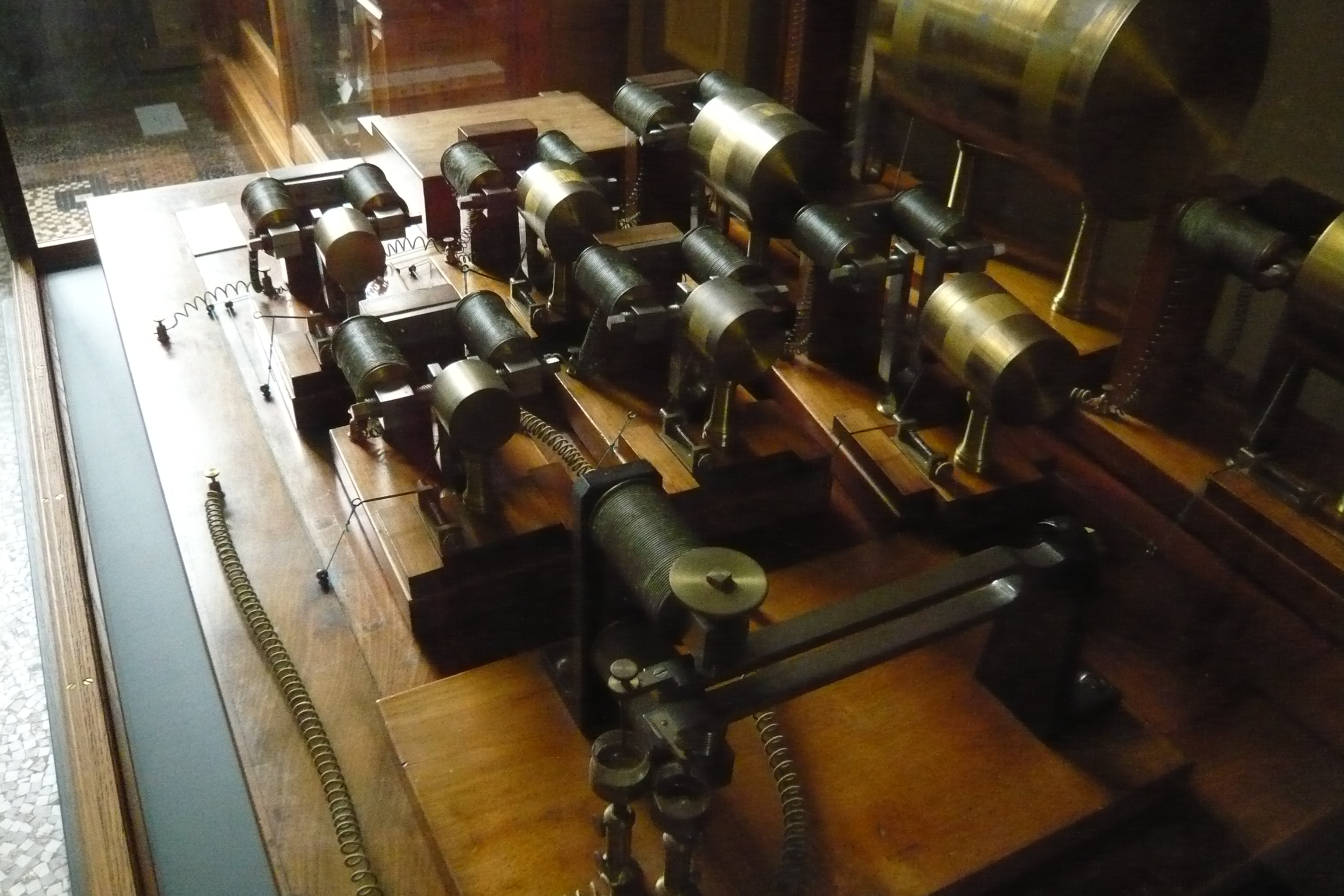
sound synthesizer

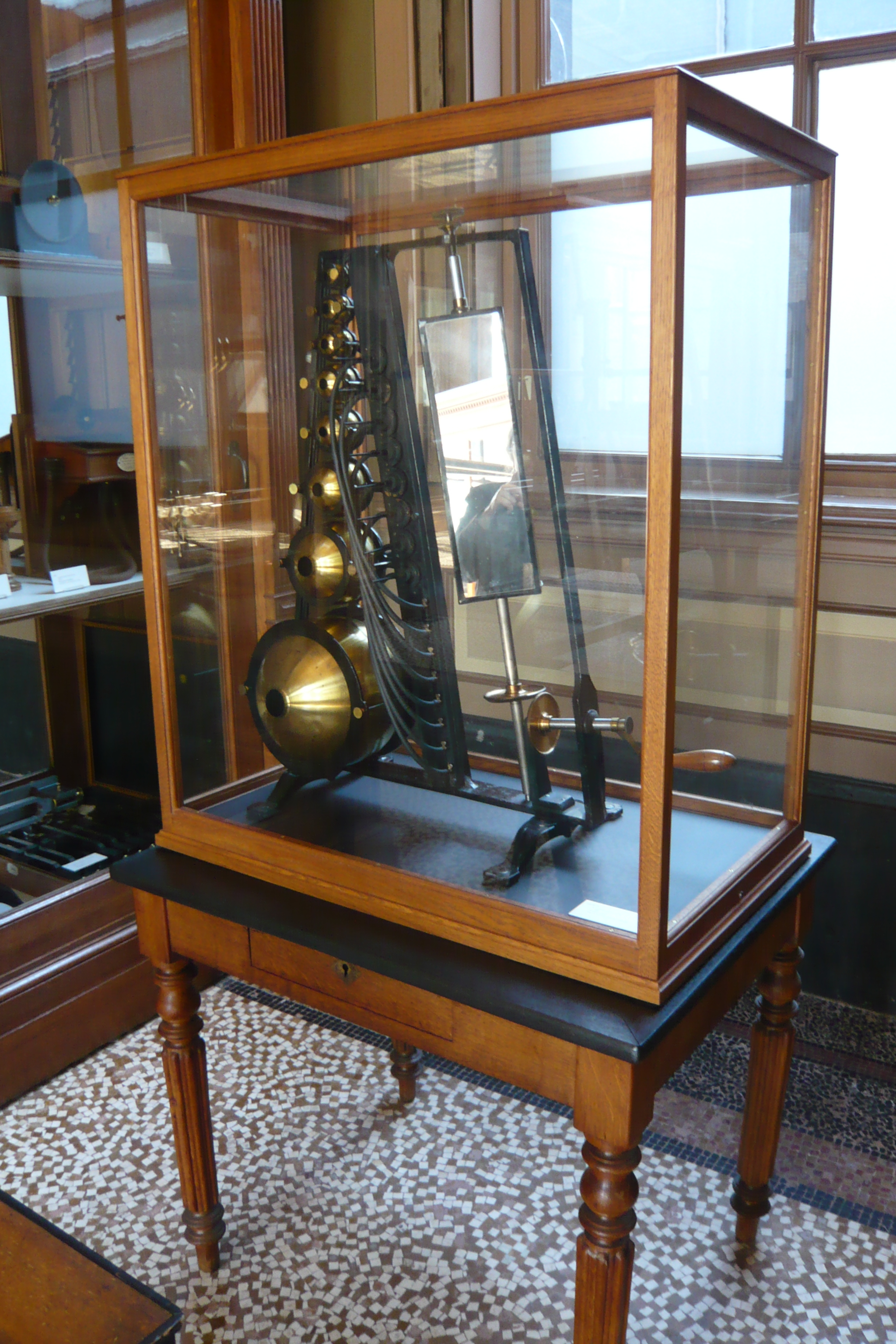
sound analyzer

In Helmholtz's time, electronic amplification was unavailable. For synthesis of tones with harmonic partials, Helmholtz built an electrically excited array of tuning forks and acoustic resonance chambers that allowed adjustment of the amplitudes of the partials. Built at least as early as in 1862, these were in turn refined by Rudolph Koenig, who demonstrated his own setup in 1872. For harmonic synthesis, Koenig also built a large apparatus based on his wave siren. It was pneumatic and utilized cut-out tonewheels, and was criticized for low purity of its partial tones. Also tibia pipes of pipe organs have nearly sinusoidal waveforms and can be combined in the manner of additive synthesis.

In 1938, with significant new supporting evidence, it was reported on the pages of Popular Science Monthly that the human vocal cords function like a fire siren to produce a harmonic-rich tone, which is then filtered by the vocal tract to produce different vowel tones. By the time, the additive Hammond organ was already on market. Most early electronic organ makers thought it too expensive to manufacture the plurality of oscillators required by additive organs, and began instead to build subtractive ones. In a 1940 Institute of Radio Engineers meeting, the head field engineer of Hammond elaborated on the company's new Novachord as having a "subtractive system" in contrast to the original Hammond organ in which "the final tones were built up by combining sound waves". Alan Douglas used the qualifiers additive and subtractive to describe different types of electronic organs in a 1948 paper presented to the Royal Musical Association. The contemporary wording additive synthesis and subtractive synthesis can be found in his 1957 book The electrical production of music, in which he categorically lists three methods of forming of musical tone-colours, in sections titled Additive synthesis, Subtractive synthesis, and Other forms of combinations.

A typical modern additive synthesizer produces its output as an electrical, analog signal, or as digital audio, such as in the case of software synthesizers, which became popular around year 2000.

=== Timeline ===
The following is a timeline of historically and technologically notable analog and digital synthesizers and devices implementing additive synthesis.

Research implementation or publication	Commercially available	Company or institution	Synthesizer or synthesis device	Description	Audio samples
1900	1906	New England Electric Music Company	Telharmonium	The first polyphonic, touch-sensitive music synthesizer. Implemented sinuosoidal additive synthesis using tonewheels and alternators. Invented by Thaddeus Cahill.	no known recordings
1933	1935	Hammond Organ Company	Hammond Organ	An electronic additive synthesizer that was commercially more successful than Telharmonium. Implemented sinusoidal additive synthesis using tonewheels and magnetic pickups. Invented by Laurens Hammond.	Model A
1950 or earlier		Haskins Laboratories	Pattern Playback	A speech synthesis system that controlled amplitudes of harmonic partials by a spectrogram that was either hand-drawn or an analysis result. The partials were generated by a multi-track optical tonewheel.	samples
1958			ANS	An additive synthesizer that played microtonal spectrogram-like scores using multiple multi-track optical tonewheels. Invented by Evgeny Murzin. A similar instrument that utilized electronic oscillators, the Oscillator Bank, and its input device Spectrogram were realized by Hugh Le Caine in 1959.	1964 model
1963		MIT		An off-line system for digital spectral analysis and resynthesis of the attack and steady-state portions of musical instrument timbres by David Luce.	
1964		University of Illinois	Harmonic Tone Generator	An electronic, harmonic additive synthesis system invented by James Beauchamp.	samples (info)
1974 or earlier	1974	RMI	Harmonic Synthesizer	The first synthesizer product that implemented additive synthesis using digital oscillators. The synthesizer also had a time-varying analog filter. RMI was a subsidiary of Allen Organ Company, which had released the first commercial digital church organ, the Allen Computer Organ, in 1971, using digital technology developed by North American Rockwell.	1 2 3 4
1974		EMS (London)	Digital Oscillator Bank	A bank of digital oscillators with arbitrary waveforms, individual frequency and amplitude controls, intended for use in analysis-resynthesis with the digital Analysing Filter Bank (AFB) also constructed at EMS. Also known as: DOB.	in The New Sound of Music
1976	1976	Fairlight	Qasar M8	An all-digital synthesizer that used the fast Fourier transform to create samples from interactively drawn amplitude envelopes of harmonics.	samples
1977		Bell Labs	Digital Synthesizer	A real-time, digital additive synthesizer that has been called the first true digital synthesizer. Also known as: Alles Machine, Alice.	sample (info)
1979	1979	New England Digital	Synclavier II	A commercial digital synthesizer that enabled development of timbre over time by smooth cross-fades between waveforms generated by additive synthesis.	Jon Appleton - Sashasonjon
	1996	Kawai	K5000	A commercial digital synthesizer workstation capable of polyphonic, digital additive synthesis of up to 128 sinusodial waves, as well as combing PCM waves.	

== Discrete-time equations ==
In digital implementations of additive synthesis, discrete-time equations are used in place of the continuous-time synthesis equations. A notational convention for discrete-time signals uses brackets i.e. $y[n]\,$ and the argument $n\,$ can only be integer values. If the continuous-time synthesis output $y(t)\,$ is expected to be sufficiently bandlimited; below half the sampling rate or $f_\mathrm{s}/2\,$, it suffices to directly sample the continuous-time expression to get the discrete synthesis equation. The continuous synthesis output can later be reconstructed from the samples using a digital-to-analog converter. The sampling period is $T=1/f_\mathrm{s}\,$.

Beginning with (3),

$$y(t) = \sum_{k=1}^{K} r_k(t) \cos\left(2 \pi \int_0^t f_k(u)\ du + \phi_k \right)$$

and sampling at discrete times $t = nT = n/f_\mathrm{s} \,$ results in

$$\begin{align}
y[n] & = y(nT) = \sum_{k=1}^{K} r_k(nT) \cos\left(2 \pi \int_0^{nT} f_k(u)\ du + \phi_k \right) \\
& = \sum_{k=1}^{K} r_k(nT) \cos\left(2 \pi \sum_{i=1}^{n} \int_{(i-1)T}^{iT} f_k(u)\ du + \phi_k \right) \\
& = \sum_{k=1}^{K} r_k(nT) \cos\left(2 \pi \sum_{i=1}^{n} (T f_k[i]) + \phi_k \right) \\
& = \sum_{k=1}^{K} r_k[n] \cos\left(\frac{2 \pi}{f_\mathrm{s}} \sum_{i=1}^{n} f_k[i] + \phi_k \right) \\
\end{align}$$

where

$r_k[n] = r_k(nT) \,$ is the discrete-time varying amplitude envelope
$f_k[n] = \frac{1}{T} \int_{(n-1)T}^{nT} f_k(t)\ dt \,$ is the discrete-time backward difference instantaneous frequency.

This is equivalent to

$$y[n] = \sum_{k=1}^{K} r_k[n] \cos\left( \theta_k[n] \right)$$

where

$$\begin{align}
\theta_k[n] &= \frac{2 \pi}{f_\mathrm{s}} \sum_{i=1}^{n} f_k[i] + \phi_k \\
&= \theta_k[n-1] + \frac{2 \pi}{f_\mathrm{s}} f_k[n] \\
\end{align}$$
for all $n>0\,$

and

$$\theta_k[0] = \phi_k. \,$$

== See also ==
- Frequency modulation synthesis
- Subtractive synthesis
- Speech synthesis
- Harmonic series (music)
