= Kawai XD-5 =

Drum machine

XD-5
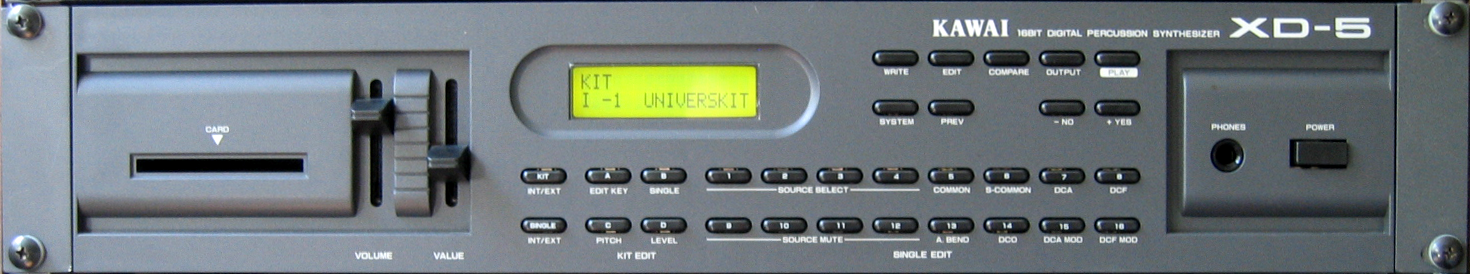
- Kawai XD-5 percussion synthesizer
- Manufacturer: Kawai
- Dates: 1989 - 1990
- Price: UK £599; US $850

Technical specifications
- Polyphony: 16 voices
- Timbrality: 8 part
- Oscillator: 4 - Pulse, ROM, Saw Up, Sine, Square, Super Saw, Triangle, Wave Table, White Noise
- LFO: 1 - Sample & Hold, Saw Up, Triangle
- Synthesis type: ROM, Vector synthesis
- Filter: 1 - 12dB Slope (2-pole), Low Pass, Resonance
- Attenuator: DCA: digital envelope
- Storage memory: 64 patches, 16 DrumKits, external memory card

Input/output
- External control: MIDI In, out, thru

The Kawai XD-5 is a percussion synthesizer based on the Kawai K4 sample playback (but uses 16-bit 44.1 kHz sample rate as opposed to 32 kHz ) with filter and AM amplifier modulation synthesis architecture. It is essentially a Kawai K4r with percussion waveforms, plus faster envelopes, gate mode and amplifier to better suit percussion sounds. The XD-5 also features include 32 digital oscillators each capable of using one of 256 available 16-bit waveforms, a digital filter with self resonance and 8 individual outputs.

== Expandability ==
The XD-5 uses expansion cards to allow an increased number of tones to be stored externally.. One card can hold 64 Patches, 16 kit Patches and 16 output patches.

== Sounds ==
Kick, snare, rim, tom, hi hat, cymbals and other assorted percussion sounds as well as 41 Digital Cyclic waveforms.

== Notable users ==
- THD
- Richie Hawtin
