= Tibia (disambiguation) =

The tibia is a bone in the leg of humans and other vertebrates.

Tibia may also refer to:

- Tibia (gastropod), a genus of sea snails
- Tibia (reedpipe) or aulos, an ancient Greek and Roman wind instrument
- Tibia (organ pipe), a sort of organ pipe that is most characteristic of a theatre organ
- Tibia (video game), a 1997 MMORPG
- Tibia (arthropod leg), a segment of the arthropod leg
