= Q80 =

Q80 may refer to:

- Q80 (New York City bus)
- Abasa, a surah of the Quran
- French submarine Newton
- Kawai Q-80, a music sequencer
