= Organ pipe =

Musical instrument part

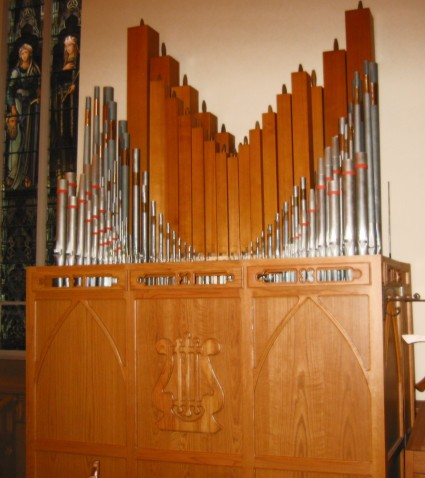
The choir division of the organ at St. Raphael's Cathedral, Dubuque, Iowa. Wooden and metal pipes of a variety of sizes are shown in this photograph.

An organ pipe is a sound-producing element of the pipe organ that resonates at a specific pitch when pressurized air (commonly referred to as wind) is driven through it. Each pipe is tuned to a note of the musical scale. A set of organ pipes of similar timbre comprising the complete scale is known as a rank; one or more ranks constitutes a stop.

== Construction ==
=== Materials ===
Organ pipes are generally made out of either metal or wood. Very rarely, glass, porcelain, plastic, paper, Papier-mâché, or even stone pipes may be seen. A historical organ in the Philippines has pipes made exclusively of bamboo.

==== Metal ====
Metal pipes are usually made of lead; for increased rigidity it is alloyed with tin along with trace amounts of antimony and copper. The percentage of each metal in the alloy influences the characteristics of the resulting pipe. A high proportion of tin results in a slightly brighter colour (optical colour, not timbre). In addition, high amounts of tin give a gleaming and long-lasting polish, which may be desired if the pipe is clearly visible. The cost of each metal is also a factor, as tin is more expensive than lead. Cost considerations may also lead to the use of the inferior rolled zinc especially for the lower tones that take a lot of material. In addition, pipes have been made of many metals, including copper, aluminium, gold electroplate, silver, brass, and iron.

Metal pipes are generally made by first casting the desired lead alloy onto a long flat surface. Once the metal cools, it is cut into pieces, which are then rolled into shapes around molds called mandrels and soldered together. Thus, the cross-section of a metal pipe is usually circular. The low melting point, solderability and malleability of the organ metal makes the construction of pipes relatively easy.

==== Wood ====
The body of a wooden pipe can be made of either a coniferous wood (softwood) or hardwood, although the lower section of the pipe (comprising the metal foot (on some pipes), cap, block and mouth) will nearly always be made from hardwood to provide a precise edge for the pipe's mouth. Using screws and glue, the pipes are assembled from wooden pieces of various shapes and sizes. In contrast with the circular cross-section of a metal pipe, the cross-section of a wooden pipe is most commonly square or rectangular.

==== Glass ====
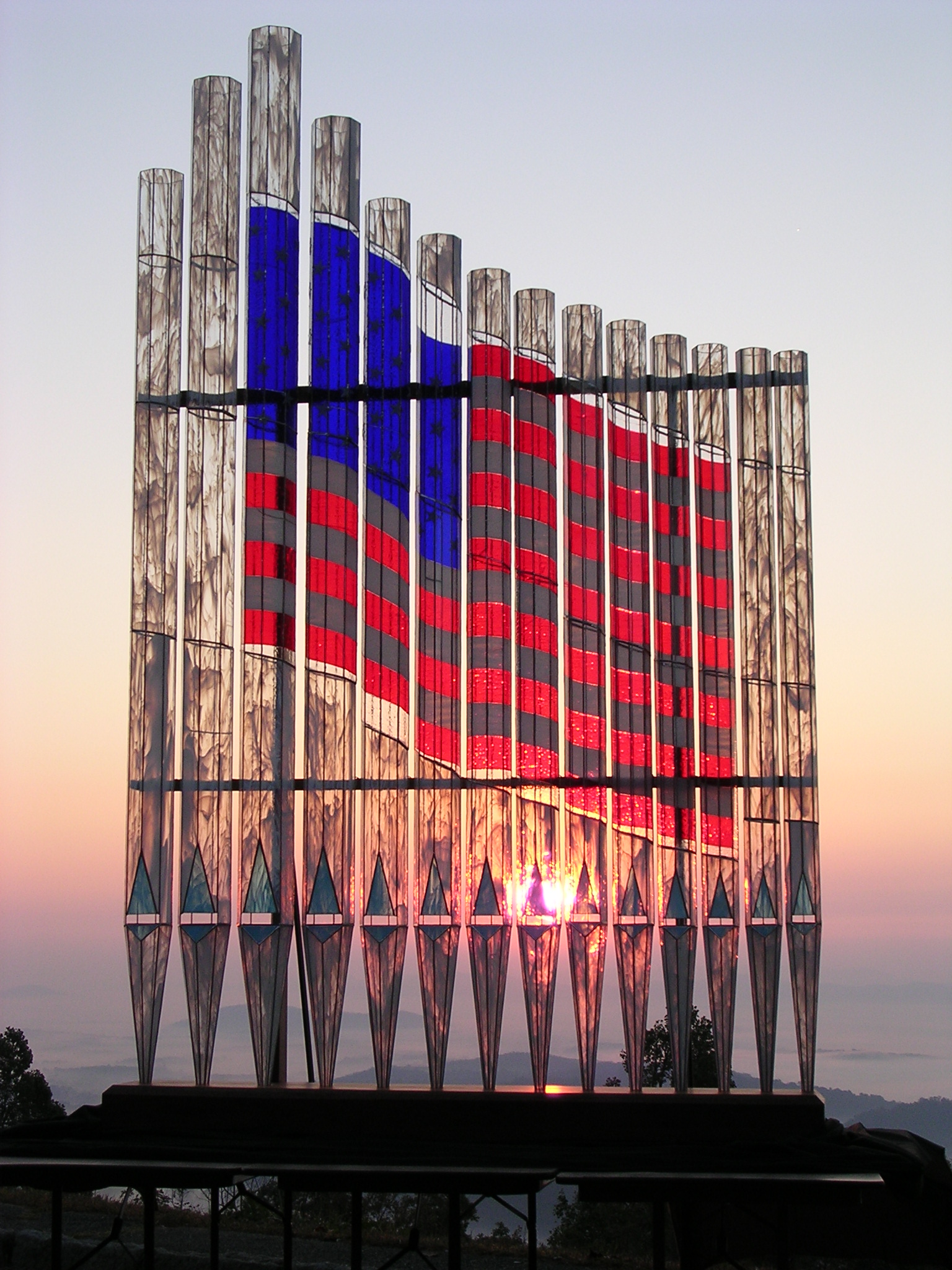
The Wilhelmy American Flag Glass Pipe Organ

Glass pipes have been created using warm glass and stained glass techniques by Xaver Wilhelmy. Three Wilhelmy glass ranks exist in the United States, two in a private collection in West Virginia and one in a private collection in Virginia. The image at left shows the Wilhelmy American Flag Glass Pipe Organ that was created as a part of a Memorial Proposal for Ground Zero after the events of September 11, 2001.

=== Shapes ===
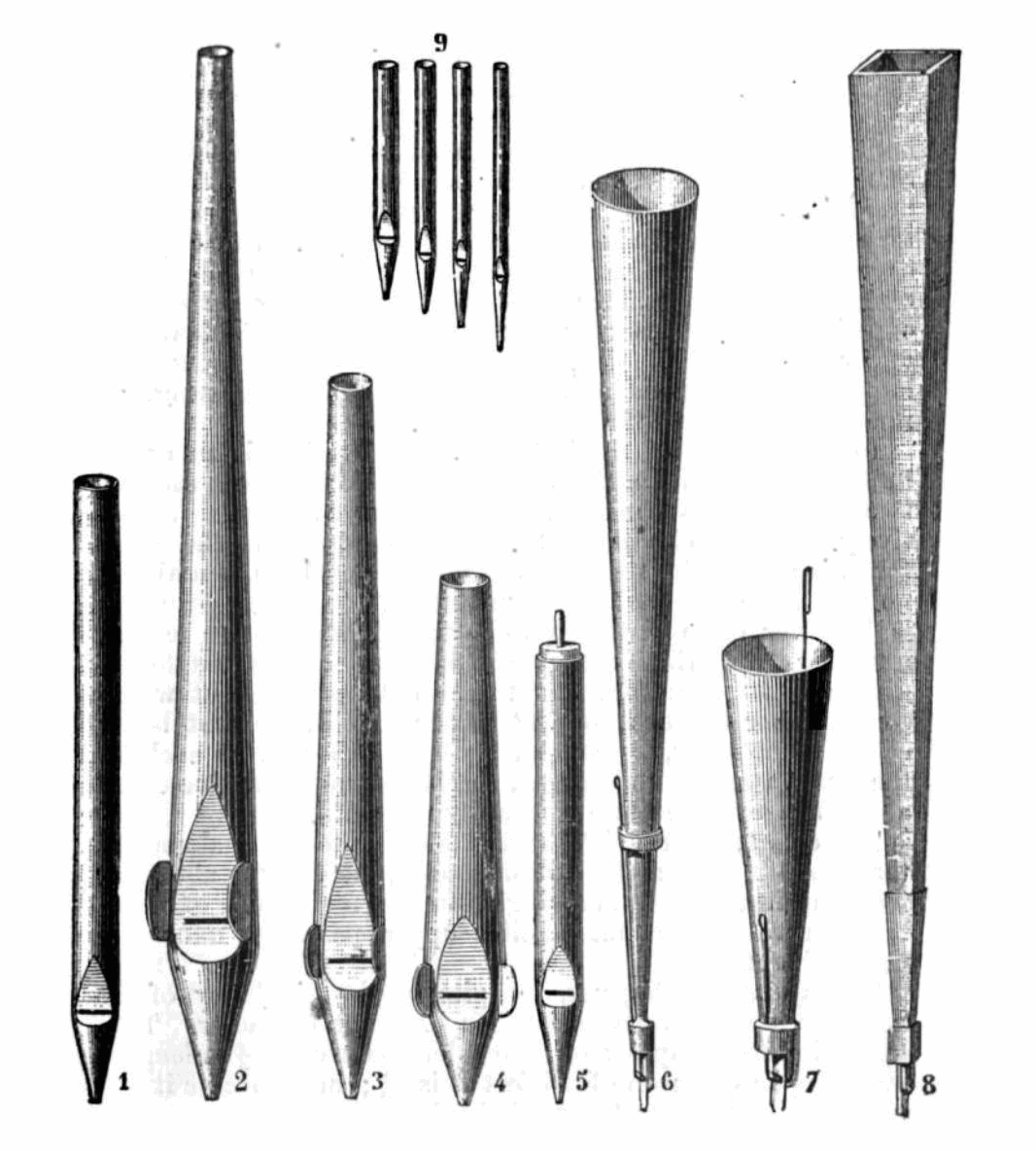
Organ pipe shapes

The bodies of organ pipes are generally made in three shapes: cylindrical, conical, or rectangular. Cylindrical pipes are simple cylinders, while conical pipes are in the shape of a tapering or expanding cone. Rectangular pipes form cuboid shapes with either a square or rectangular cross-section when viewed from above. There are some irregular shapes as well: the Flûte triangulaire, for example, has a triangular cross-section when viewed from above. In addition, a cylindrical or rectangular pipe can be tapered: that is, it can be made to be wider at the bottom than at the top. The internal shape of the pipe is a major factor in tone color.

The end of the pipe opposite the reed or mouth may be either open or closed (also known as stopped). A closed flue pipe with a uniform cross-section sounds an octave lower than a similar open pipe of the same length. Also, such an open pipe produces a tone in which both the even-numbered and the odd-numbered partials are present, while a stopped pipe, such as a gedackt, produces a tone with odd-numbered partials. The tone of a stopped pipe tends to be gentler and sweeter than that of an open pipe, though this is largely at the discretion of the voicer.

Certain organ pipes are also mounted horizontally in the shape of a trumpet horn so as to project the sound farther. These pipes are known as en chamades. However, when such a commanding tone is desired but it is impossible to mount an en chamade on the case, a hooded reed is used. This type of pipe stands vertically and has a 90-degree bend at the top which acts to project the sound outward in the same way an en chamade does, but can be placed in the interior of an organ.

== Pitch ==
The pitch produced by an organ pipe is determined in two fundamentally different ways. For a reed pipe it is determined mainly by the mechanical properties of the reed and the length of the protruding part. For the flue pipes it is determined by the shape of the air column inside the pipe and whether the column is open at the end. For those pipes the pitch is a function of its length, the wavelength of the sound produced by an open pipe being approximately twice its length. A pipe half the length of another will sound one octave higher. If the longest pipe, C, is 8 feet (2.4 m) in length, the pipe one octave higher will be 4 feet (1.2 m) long, and two octaves above (middle C) will be 2 feet (0.61 m) long. A closed (stopped) pipe produces a sound one octave lower than an open pipe. For example, a stopped pipe 4 feet (1.2 m) long will produce the same pitch as an open pipe 8 feet long: two octaves below middle C.

The nomenclature of a rank of pipes is based on the size of an open pipe that would produce the same pitch, regardless of the type or size of the actual pipes in the rank. For example, a rank of open pipes labeled as 8′ (pronounced "eight-foot") would have a pipe for C two octaves below middle C that is approximately 8 feet long. An 8′ stop is said to sound at "unison pitch": the keys on the organ console produce the expected pitch (e.g. the key for middle C causes a middle C pipe to speak), like a piano. In a rank of stopped pipes, the lowest pipe is 4 feet in length but sounds at unison pitch—that is, at the same pitch as an 8′ open pipe—so it is known as an 8′ stop. Reed pipes are also labeled the same as that of an open pipe with the same pitch, regardless of the actual length of the pipe.

== Varieties ==
=== Flue pipes ===
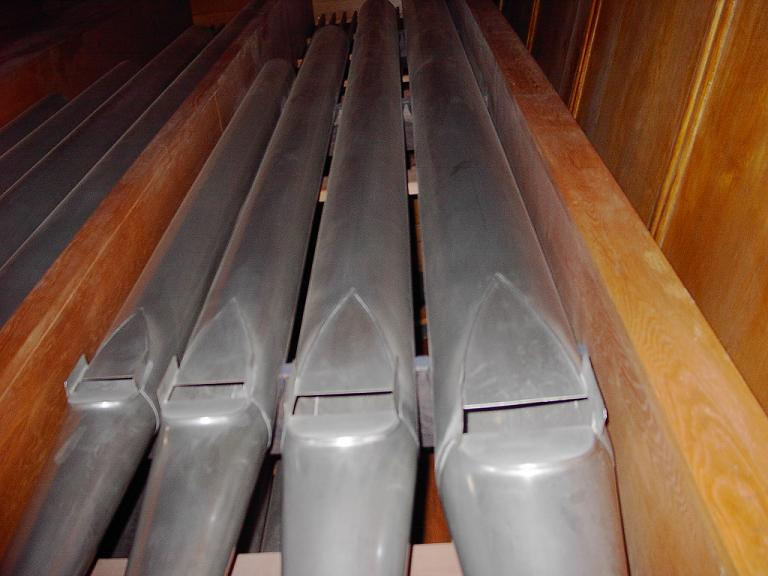
A set of flute pipes of a diapason rank in the Schuke organ in Sofia, Bulgaria.

The sound of a flue pipe is produced with no moving parts, solely from the vibration of air, in the same manner as a recorder or a whistle. Wind from the "flue", or windway is driven over an open window and against a sharp lip called a Labium. By Bernoulli's principle this produces a lower pressure region just below the window. When the vacuum under the window is large enough, the airstream is pulled under the Labium lip. Then the process works in reverse, with a low pressure region forming over the Labium which pulls the airstream to the other side again. This 'fluttering' airflow creates high and low pressure waves within the pipe's air column. A high and a low pressure wave form a single "cycle" of the pipe's tone. (See Wind Instrument.)

Flue pipes generally belong to one of three tonal families: flutes, diapasons (or principals), and strings. The basic "foundation" (from the French term fonds) sound of an organ is composed of varying combinations of diapasons and flutes, depending upon the particular organ and the literature being played.

The different sounds of these tonal families of pipes arise from their individual construction. The tone of a flue pipe is affected by the size and shape of the pipes as well as the material out of which it is made. A pipe with a wide diameter will tend to produce a flute tone, a pipe with a medium diameter a diapason tone, and a pipe with a narrow diameter a string tone. A large diameter pipe will favor the fundamental tone and restrict high frequency harmonics, while a narrower diameter favors the high harmonics and suppresses the fundamental. The science of measuring and deciding upon pipe diameters is referred to as pipe scaling, and the resulting measurements are referred to as the scale of the pipe.

=== Reed pipes ===
The sound of a reed pipe is produced by a beating reed: wind is directed towards a curved piece of brass (the reed). A partial vacuum is created by higher velocity air flowing under the reed which causes it to be pulled closed against a hard surface called the shallot. This shuts off the vacuum and allows the reed to spring open again. A tuned resonator extends above this assembly and reinforces the sound produced. The principle is the same as that of the orchestral clarinet. The pitch of a reed pipe is determined primarily by the length of the reed but the volume of air in the resonator supports that frequency. Most reed pipes have a slide to adjust the vibrating length of the reed to fine-tune it. Because of the precision required in the making of the vibrating reed, resonator pipe and its accompanying parts, reed pipes are more complicated to manufacture than flue pipes.

By altering any of several parameters (including the shape and volume of the resonator, as well as the thickness and shape of the reed), a reed pipe can produce a wide variety of tonal colors. This allows reed stops to imitate historical musical instruments, such as the krumhorn or the regal. Because the resonator is partially stopped/closed by the reed, odd-numbered partials/harmonics are dominant (in the hollow tones of Krumhorn and Clarinet stops, for example). If the resonator pipe expands outward to conical, the geometry allows the production of both even- and odd-numbered partials, resulting in the fuller tones of Trumpet and Oboe stops.

=== Free reed pipes ===
These are quite uncommon; see "Free reeds" in the "Reed pipe" article.

=== Diaphone pipes ===
The diaphone is a unique organ pipe. Uncommon in church and concert pipe organs, they are quite common in Theatre Organs. Invented by Robert Hope-Jones around 1900, it has characteristics of both flue pipes and reed pipes. The pipe speaks through a resonator, much like a reed pipe, but a spring-loaded pallet instigates the vibration instead of a reed. Possessing a powerful bass groundtone, the pipe is generally made of wood and can be voiced at various wind pressures. The diaphone is usually found at 16' and 32' pitches, however there are a few examples of 8' diaphones. There are two 32' Diaphones in Philadelphia's Wanamaker Organ, and a full-length 64' Diaphone-Dulzian is installed in the Boardwalk Hall Auditorium Organ in Atlantic City.

The Diaphone pipes are used for the bottom 12 or 18 notes of the 16' Diapason rank, and also for its bottom 32' octave, on those few Theatre Organs that go that low.

Hope-Jones also developed an imitative version of the diaphone called the diaphonic horn, which had a more reed-like quality than the diaphone and was voiced on lower wind pressures. Wurlitzer built a version of the diaphonic horn for their theater organs at 32' and 16' pitches with huge wooden resonators as extensions of its Diaphonic diapason, and at 16' with metal resonators as an extension of its smaller-scale Open diapason. The Austin Organ Company also developed a metal diaphone at 16' pitch known as a Magnaton. Due to its penetrating tone, a diaphone-type horn has also been used in foghorns and fire signals.

== See also ==
- Tibia (organ pipe)
- Tone hole
