= Xaver Wilhelmy =

Organ builder

- Citizenship: Austrian
- Education: Rieger Orgelbau
- Occupation: Pipe organ builder
- Website: www.geshenke.com

Xaver Wilhelmy is an inventor, designer and certified pipe organ builder who was the first in the world to create organ pipes from glass. Wilhelmy created the Wilhelmy American Flag Glass Pipe Organ, the first pipe organ in the world with pipes made entirely from glass.

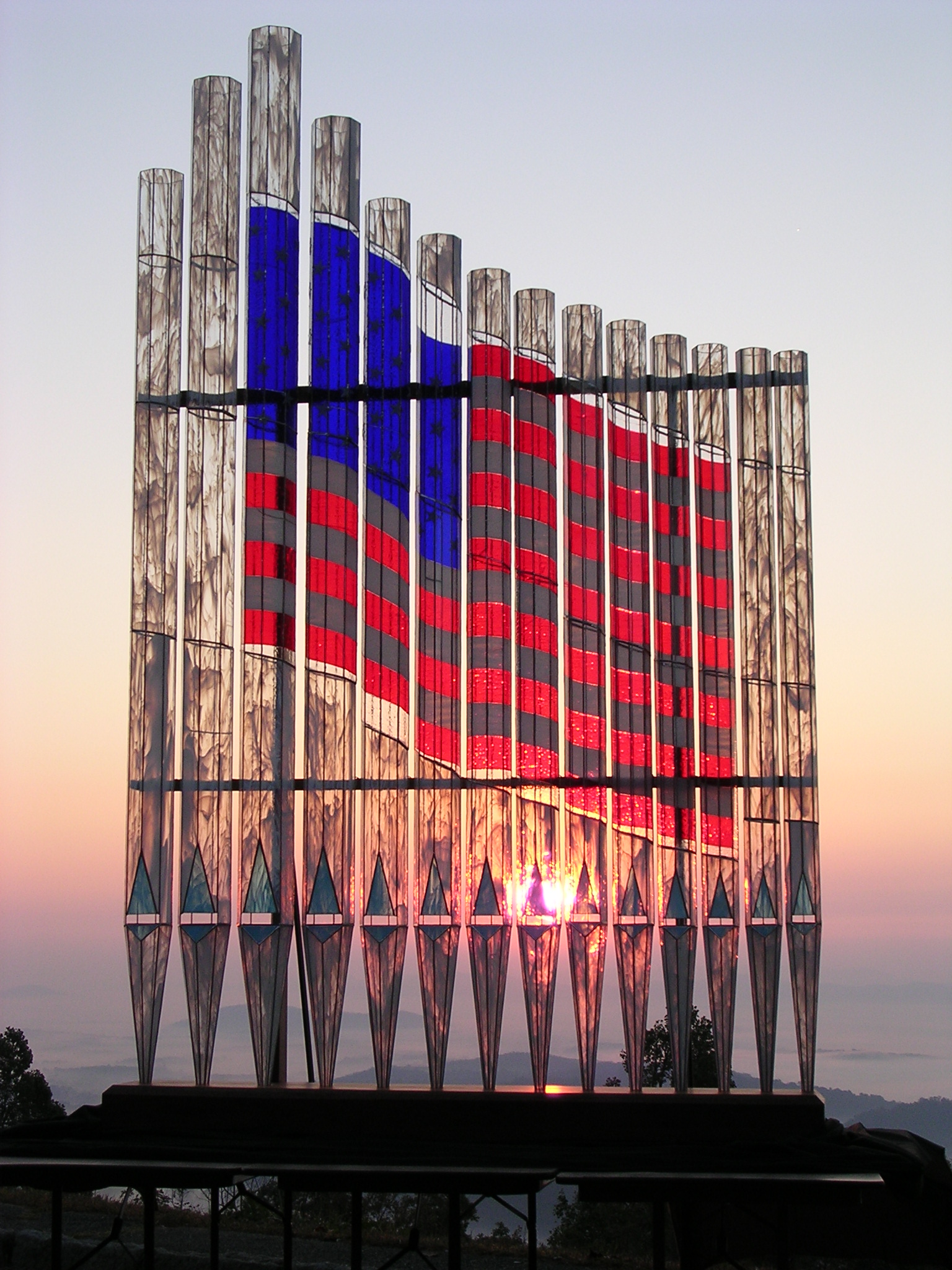
The Wilhelmy American Flag Glass Pipe Organ

The concept of the Wilhelmy American Flag Glass Pipe Organ emerged from the tragedy of the September 11 attacks. Wilhelmy envisioned a glass pipe organ with one organ pipe to represent each of the voices that were permanently silenced. Wilhelmy created a memorial proposal of light and sound for the Memorial Competition for the World Trade Center Site.

The Wilhelmy American Flag Glass Pipe Organ is a series of 14 glass flue organ pipes that Wilhelmy made using kiln-working, precision stained-glass techniques, and delicate pipe organ engineering. The instrument took more than 18 months from conception to completion in a project that married art, design, and engineering.

Another landmark instrument includes the Wilhelmy Glass Trompetteria which consists of a Trumpet 8' and Clarion 4', and features glass reed pipes, and is in a private collection in West Virginia, U.S.A. Additional individual glass organ pipes are in private collections in the US and Europe.

The Steiner Pipe Organ at Friedberg Moravian Christian Church, in Winston-Salem, NC, is home to a pair of matching glass organ pipes that are 5 feet 7 inches tall, polygonal, and are part of the Principle 8 organ stop. Wilhelmy created them using clear, textured, and iridescent art glass and mirrored glass for a gently reflective look that is in keeping with the simplicity and understated elegance of the Steiner organ and Moravian chapel.

Wilhelmy is the author of "The Art of Casting High Lead Pipe Metal" published in the March 1998 issue of the ISO Journal (International Society of Organbuilders) and translated into German and French.

== Biography ==
Originally from Austria, Xaver Wilhelmy trained as a pipe organ builder at Rieger Orgelbau in Schwarzach, Vorarlberg (Austria), continued his education in Ludwigsburg, Germany, then joined Fehrle en Roeleveld Orrelbouers outside Johannesburg, South Africa, where he also trained as a piano builder, and luthier. Wilhelmy won the Austrian Creativity Competition for work related to Art, Music, and Architecture in 2005 for his work creating the first glass organ pipes in the world.

Xaver Wilhelmy immigrated to the United States in 1994 where he joined Taylor & Boody Organ Builders in Staunton, Virginia as Pipe Shop Supervisor.

Currently, Wilhelmy is the Pipe Organ Designer, Consultant, and Educator at Geshenke Aus Glas of Staunton, Virginia, a company that specializes in glass organ pipes.

Wilhelmy is the founder of The Wilhelmy School, dedicated to passing the fundamentals of pipe organ building and innovation along to a new generation of builders, performers, and conservationists in order to preserve, conserve, and improve upon the most remarkable instrument ever created.
