= Kawai Musical Instruments =

Musical instrument company

Kawai Musical Instruments Manufacturing Co., Ltd.
- Native name: 株式会社河合楽器製作所
- Romanized name: Kabushiki-gaisha Kawai Gakki Seisakusho
- Type: Public (K.K.)
- Traded as: TYO: 7952
- Industry: Musical instruments
- Founded: August 1927; 99 years ago
- Founder: Koichi Kawai
- Headquarters: Hamamatsu, Shizuoka, Japan
- Area served: Worldwide
- Key people: Hirotaka Kawai (chmn., pres. and CEO)
- Products: Grand pianos and upright pianos
- Revenue: ▼¥80,192 million ($530 million) (2024)
- Operating income: ▼¥3,270 million ($21 million) (2024)
- Net income: ▼¥2,782 million ($18 million) (2024)
- Total assets: ▲¥73,538 million ($486 million) (2024)
- Total equity: ¥43,141 million ($285 million) (2024)
- Number of employees: 2,895 (2024)
- Website: www.kawai-global.com

Kawai Musical Instruments Manufacturing Co., Ltd. (株式会社河合楽器製作所, Kabushiki-gaisha Kawai Gakki Seisakusho; TYO: 7952) is a musical instrument manufacturing company headquartered in Hamamatsu, Shizuoka, Japan. It is best known for its grand pianos, upright pianos, digital pianos, electronic keyboards and electronic synthesizers. The company was founded in August 1927.

== History ==
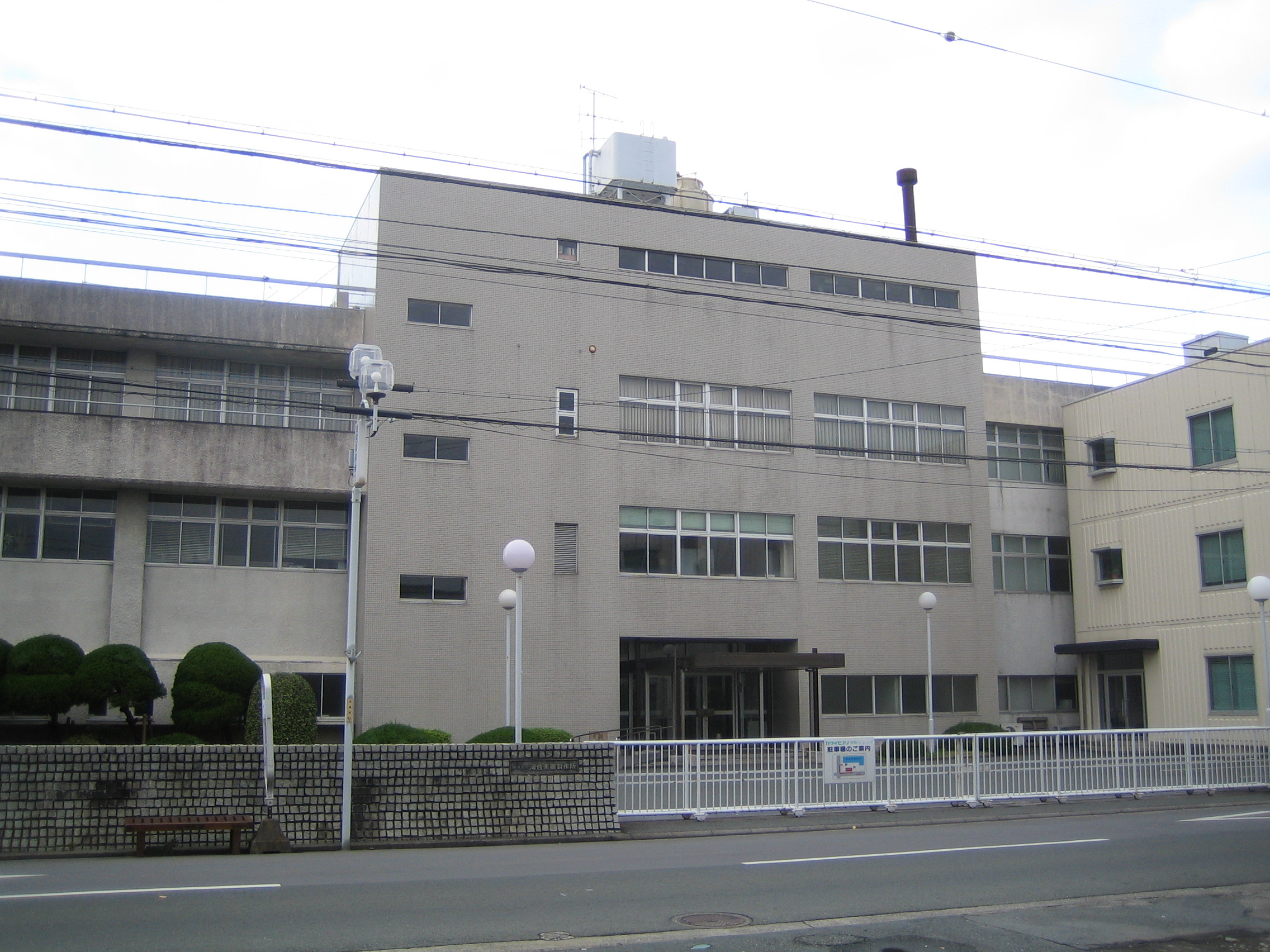
HQ of Kawai Musical Instruments in Hamamatsu

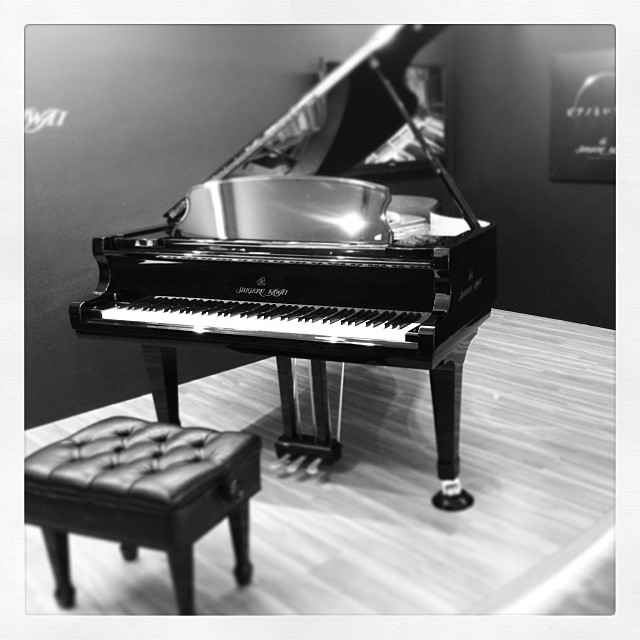
Shigeru Kawai Grand Piano

Koichi Kawai, the company founder, was born in Hamamatsu, Japan in 1886. His neighbor, Torakusu Yamaha, a watchmaker and reed organ builder, took him in as an apprentice. Kawai became a member of the research and development team that introduced pianos to Japan. Yamaha died in 1916, and in the 1920s the piano industry faltered in Japan. New management took over control of Yamaha's company, Nippon Gakki Co. (later renamed the Yamaha Corporation), and began to diversify its production line. This led Kawai to leave Nippon Gakki in 1927 and found the Kawai Musical Instrument Research Laboratory.

After Koichi Kawai's death in 1955, his son, Shigeru Kawai became company president at 33 and expanded production facilities. In 1980, he opened the Ryuyo Grand Piano Factory. Shigeru Kawai was president of the Kawai company from 1955 to 1989, chairman from 1990 until 2002, and a company consultant until his death in 2006 at 84.

Shigeru Kawai's son, Hirotaka Kawai, was appointed president in 1989. He integrated advanced robotics into the manufacturing process, established Kawai manufacturing facilities around the globe, and oversaw the introduction of several new series of grand, upright and digital pianos.

The Kawai Musical Instrument Manufacturing Company distributes acoustic and digital pianos to over 80 countries.

== Products ==
=== Pianos ===
Since the 1970s, Kawai has pioneered the use of alternative materials to improve the consistency and stability of piano performance. In 1971, the company began to use acrylonitrile butadiene styrene (ABS), a composite material, for parts of its piano actions to overcome the problems associated with the use of wood. Kawai design engineers reasoned that the tendency of wood to shrink and swell significantly with changes in humidity made it less than ideal for use in a piano action, where exacting tolerances must be maintained to ensure stable piano touch. So they gradually replaced selected wooden action parts with ABS parts that they believed would remain more stable, particularly over time as their pianos age.

According to Kawai, scientific tests conducted by Professor Abdul Sadat at California Polytechnic University in 1998 found Kawai's ABS action parts to be stronger than comparable wooden parts and far less susceptible to shrinking and swelling due to humidity. Kawai advertises that its use of composite parts makes its piano actions more stable and consistent than those made by other manufacturers.

In 2002, Kawai introduced its Millennium III grand piano action with ABS-Carbon, a new composite material that combined ABS with carbon fiber. The new material (dubbed ABS-Carbon) increased the strength of Kawai action parts, reducing their weight, which made the overall action operate faster (very important for control when playing repeated notes or trills). The addition of carbon fiber also increased the stiffness of ABS-Carbon action parts, allowing the action to produce more power for the player with less effort. Kawai contends that these advances in materials and design help its Millennium III action respond more accurately to the player's intentions with greater consistency over time.

=== Grand pianos ===
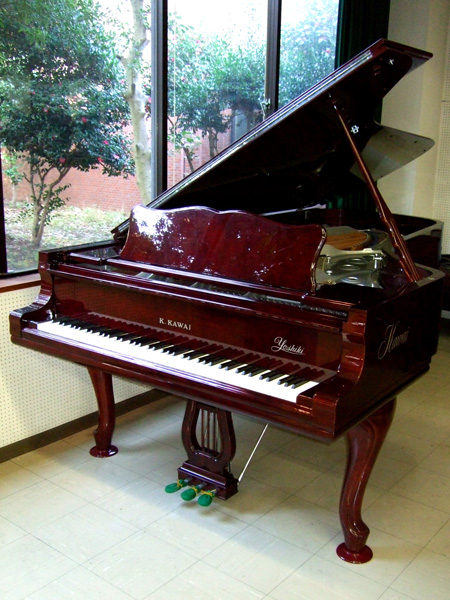
Kawai custom made concert grand piano for Yoshiki (1993)

Kawai grand pianos have evolved steadily over the decades from the Model 500/600 built in the 1960s and 1970s, to the KG Series in the 1980s and early 1990s that became popular among teachers and institutions. During these years, Kawai grand pianos earned a reputation for long-term, stable performance even in heavy use. In 1996, Kawai introduced the RX Series grand pianos featuring the Ultra-Responsive ABS Action. The RX Series continued to evolve with the introduction of the Millennium III Action with ABS-Carbon in 2004. In 2009, the RX BLAK Series debuted with a new Acoustic Resonant Solid Spruce soundboard and the addition of Phenolic Stabilizers on the hammers that further enhanced the precision of the hammer strike for improved tone and consistency. The RX BLAK Series pianos also incorporated many cosmetic changes.

In 1999, Kawai introduced the Shigeru Kawai grand piano series. These pianos are handmade by highly skilled technicians in a separate facility of Ryuyo Grand Piano Factory in Hamamatsu. Shigeru Kawai pianos are recognized as one of the best pianos in the world and are used in concerts and piano competitions all over the world alongside pianos manufactured by companies like Bösendorfer, Steinway, Yamaha and Fazioli. The Shigeru Kawai SK-EX full concert grand piano was introduced in 2001, and chosen as the official piano of the 2002 International Tchaikovsky Competition.

In 2013, Kawai introduced the GX BLAK Performance Series line of grand pianos. In Japanese, the word kuro (black) suggests wisdom, experience and nobility. Improvements include a stretcher-overlap integrated design (SOLID) and Konsei Katagi blended rim design for improved tone projection.

In 2015, Kawai introduced the GL Series line of grand pianos.

The current Kawai Grand Piano product line consists of the following models:

- Shigeru Kawai
  - SK-EX: 278 cm (9 ft 1 in)
  - SK-7: 229 cm (7 ft 6 in)
  - SK-6: 214 cm (7 ft 0 in)
  - SK-5: 200 cm (6 ft 7 in)
  - SK-3: 188 cm (6 ft 2 in)
  - SK-2: 180 cm (5 ft 11 in)
- GX BLAK Performance Series
  - GX-7 Semi Concert Grand Piano: 229 cm (7 ft 6 in)
  - GX-6 Orchestra Grand Piano: 214 cm (7 ft 0 in)
  - GX-5 Chamber Grand Piano: 200 cm (6 ft 7 in)
  - GX-3 Conservatory Grand Piano: 188 cm (6 ft 2 in)
  - GX-2 Classic Salon Grand Piano: 180 cm (5 ft 11 in)
  - GX-1 Classic Grand Piano: 166 cm (5 ft 5 in)
- GL Series
  - GL-50 Conservatory Grand Piano: 188 cm (6 ft 2 in)
  - GL-40 Classic Salon Grand Piano: 180 cm (5 ft 11 in)
  - GL-30 Classic Grand Piano: 166 cm (5 ft 5 in)
  - GL-20 Classic Baby Grand Piano: 157 cm (5 ft 2 in)
  - GL-10 Classic Baby Grand Piano: 153 cm (5 ft 0 in)
- EX Concert Grand Piano: 276 cm (9 ft 1 in)
- CR-40A Crystal Grand Piano: 185 cm (6 ft 1 in)

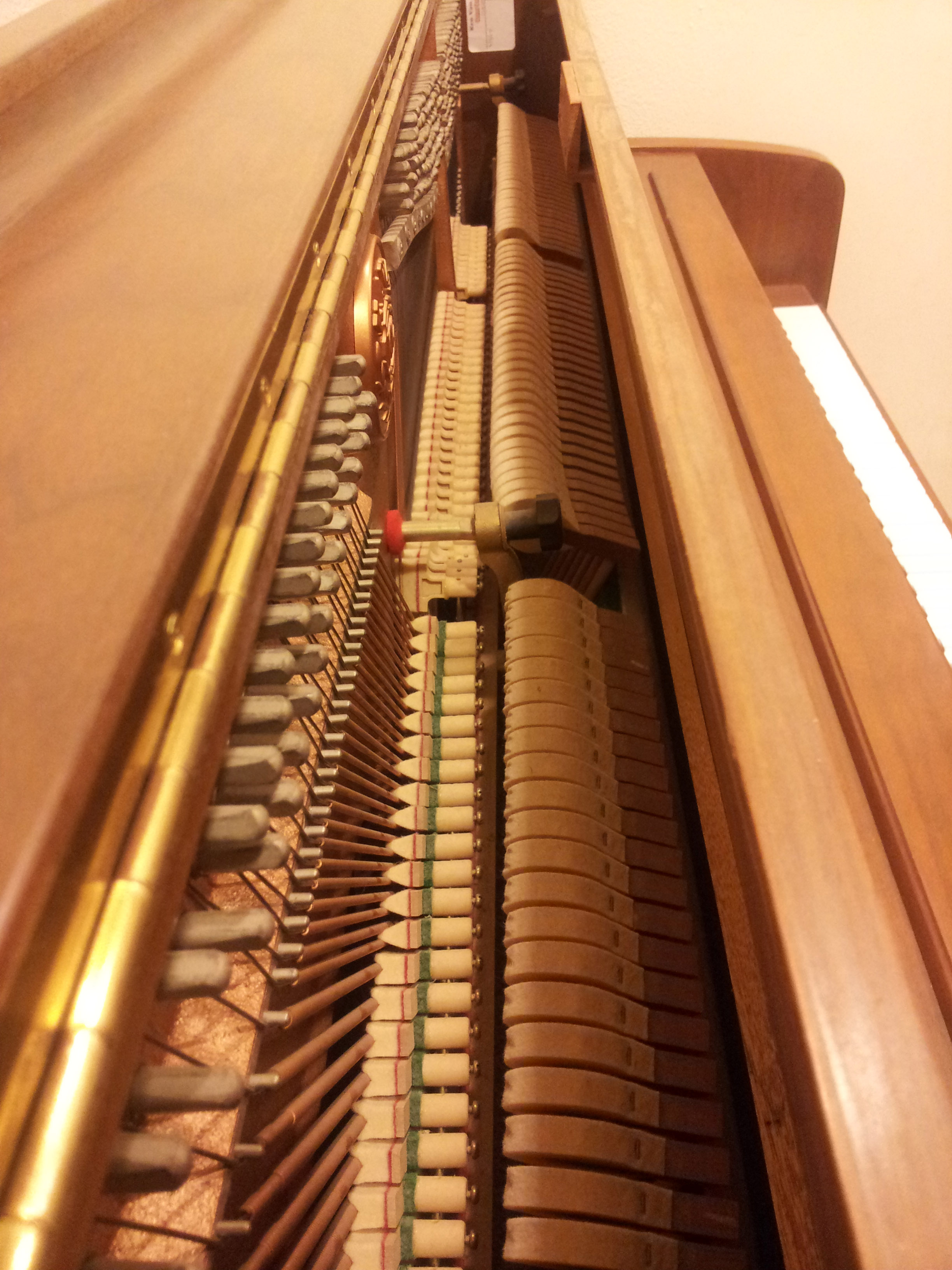
Inside of the Kawai Continental Upright

=== Upright pianos ===
Kawai upright pianos are divided into four classes - K Series Professional, Designer Series, Institutional Series and Continental Series. Kawai K Series Professional Uprights range in height from 114 to 134 cm (45 to 53 in). All have Kawai's Millennium III Upright Action with ABS-Carbon.

The current Kawai Upright Piano product line consists of the following models:

- K Series Professional
  - K-800: 134 cm (53 in)
  - K-700: 130 cm (51 in)
  - K-600: 134 cm (53 in)
  - K-500: 130 cm (51 in)
  - K-400: 122 cm (48 in)
  - K-300: 122 cm (48 in)
  - K-200: 114 cm (45 in)
- Designer Series
  - 907 Designer Studio: 117 cm (46 in)
  - 607 Designer Console: 113 cm (44 1/2 in)
  - 508 Decorator Console: 113 cm (44 1/2 in)
- Institutional Series
  - ST1: 117.5 cm (46 in)
  - 506N: 113 cm (44 1/2 in)
- Continental Series
  - K-15: 110 cm (43.3 in)
  - ND-21: 121 cm (47 1/2 in)

=== Digital pianos ===
Kawai digital pianos are divided into 7 classes - CA series, CN series, KDP series, ES series, MP series, VPC series, and DG series.

The current Kawai Digital Piano product line consists of the following models (as of April 2025):

- CA (Concert Artist) series
  - CA901 (successor of CA99)
  - CA701 (successor of CA79)
  - CA501 (successor of CA59)
  - CA401 (successor of CA49)
- CN series
  - CN301 (successor of CN39)
  - CN201 (successor of CN29)
- KDP (Kawai Digital Piano) Series
  - KDP120 (successor of KDP110)
  - KDP75 (successor of KDP70)
- ES (portable) series
  - ES920 (successor of ES8)
  - ES520
  - ES120 (successor of ES110)
  - ES60
- MP (stage piano) series
  - MP11SE
  - MP7SE
- VPC (virtual piano controller) series
  - VPC1
- DG (Digital Grand) Series
  - DG30

==== Keyboard actions and features ====
Model	Grand Feel III	Grand Feel Compact	Responsive Hammer III (RH3)	Responsive Hammer Compact II (RHC2)	Responsive Hammer Compact (RHC)	Responsive Hammer Lite (RHL)	Ivory Touch surface	Let-off simulation / escapement	Counterweights	Sensor	Velocity curves	Amplifier	Sound source	Sounds	Polyphony
ES60						yes					Light, Normal, Heavy, Off	2 x 10W	Harmonic Imaging	17, SK-EX	192
ES120					yes						Light, Normal, Heavy, Off	2 x 10W	Harmonic Imaging	25, SK-EX	192
ES520				yes						3	Light, Normal, Heavy, Off (Constant)	2 x 20W	Progressive Harmonic Imaging	34, Grand Pianos: Shigeru Kawai EX, Kawai EX	192
ES920			yes				yes	yes	yes	3	Light 1-4, Normal, Heavy 1-4, Off (Constant), User	2 x 20W	Harmonic Imaging XL	38, Grand Pianos: Shigeru Kawai EX, Kawai EX, SK-5	256
KDP75					yes					2	Adjustable Touch	2 x 9W	Harmonic Imaging	15, SK-EX	192
KDP120				yes						3	Light, Normal, Heavy, Off	2 x 20W	Harmonic Imaging	15, SK-EX	192
MP7SE			yes				yes	yes	yes	3	Light+, Light, Normal, Heavy, Heavy+, Off (Constant), User	-	Harmonic Imaging XL	SK-EX, SK-5, EX	256
MP11SE	yes						yes	yes		3	Light+, Light, Normal, Heavy, Heavy+, Off (Constant), User	-	Harmonic Imaging XL	Shigeru Kawai EX, Kawai EX, Shigeru Kawai SK-5	256
CN201			yes				yes	yes	yes	3	Light, Normal, Heavy, Off	2 x 20W	Progressive Harmonic Imaging	19, SK-EX, EX	192
CN301			yes				yes	yes	yes	3	Light 1-4, Normal, Heavy 1-4, Off (Constant), User	2 x 20W	Progressive Harmonic Imaging	SK-EX, SK-5, EX	256
CA401		yes					yes	yes	Bass Region	3	Light, Normal, Heavy, Off	2 x 20W	Progressive Harmonic Imaging	SK-EX, EX	192
CA501		yes					yes	yes	Bass Region	3	Light 1-4, Normal, Heavy 1-4, Off (Constant), User	2 x 50W	Harmonic Imaging XL	SK-EX, SK-5, EX	256
CA701	yes						yes	yes		3	Light 1-4, Normal, Heavy 1-4, Off (Constant)	2 x 50W	SK-EX Multi Channel, Harmonic Imaging XL	SK-EX, SK-5, EX	256
CA901	yes						yes	yes		3	Light 1-4, Normal, Heavy 1-4, Off (Constant)	3 x 45W	SK-EX Multi Channel, Harmonic Imaging XL	SK-EX, SK-5, EX	256
DG30			yes				yes	yes		3	Light 1-4, Normal, Heavy 1-4, Off (Constant), User	2 x 20W	Progressive Harmonic Imaging	SK-EX, SK5, EX	256
VPC1							yes	yes		3				5 Presets for virtual Software Pianos (Normal, Ivory II, PianoTeq, Galaxy Vintage D, NI Alicia's Keys), Editor for Mac and Windows	

=== Hybrid pianos ===
The current Kawai Hybrid Piano product line consists of the following models:

- Novus series
  - NV12
  - NV6
  - NV10S
  - NV5S
- AnyTime series
  - AnyTime ATX4
  - AnyTime ATX3L
- Aures series
  - Aures AR2

=== Synthesizers ===
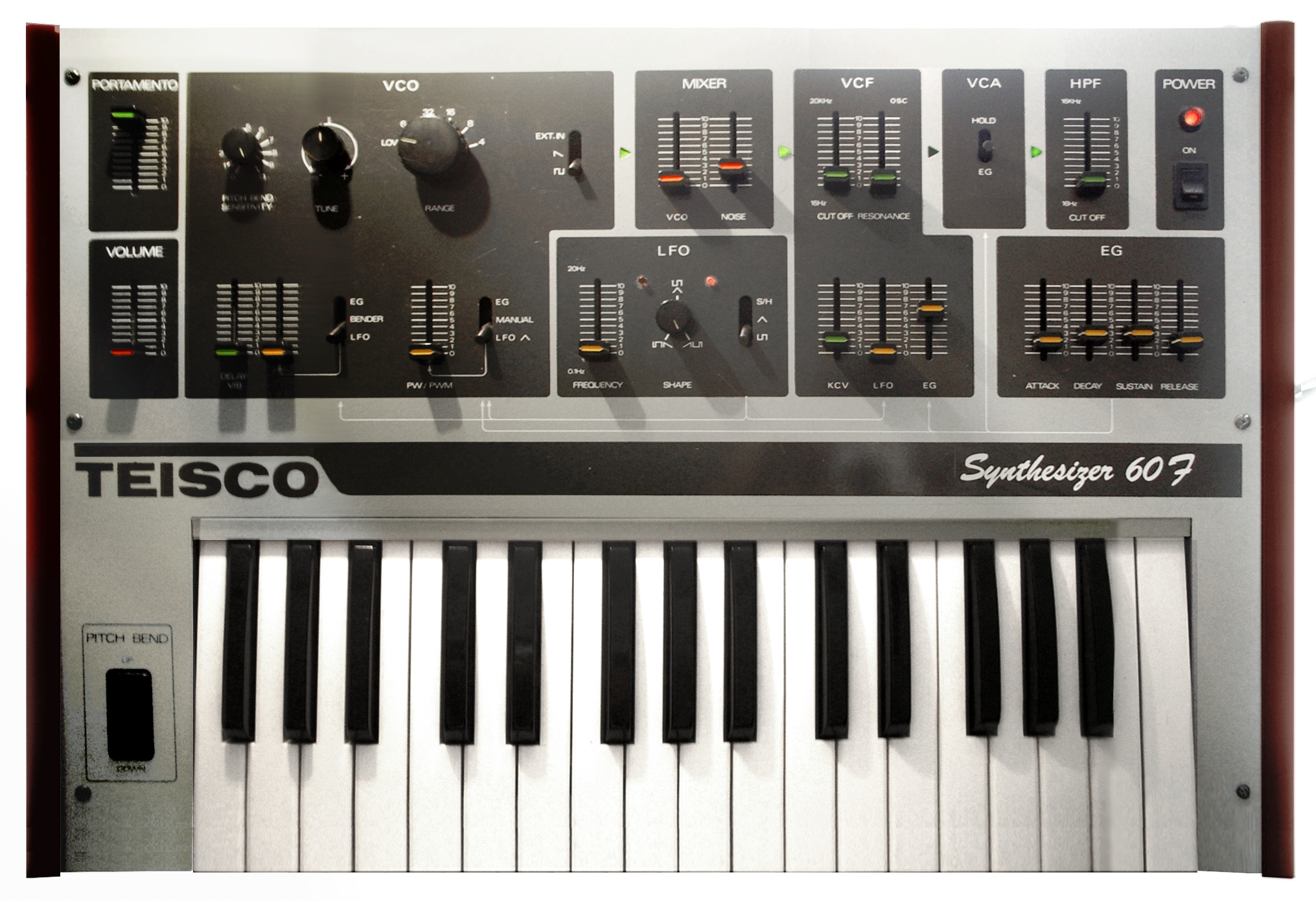
Teisco 60F (c. 1980)

Kawai started manufacturing synthesizers at the start of the 1980s under the brand name Teisco. These instruments were all analog and included the models: 60P, 60F, 110F, 100F, 100P, SX-210, SX-240, and SX-400. At some point, Kawai stopped using the "Teisco" brand, so some of these products can be found labelled either Teisco or Kawai.

During the second half of the 1980s, Kawai developed and released a number of digital synthesizers. The most known of these are the K series: Kawai K1, K1m, K1mkII, K3 (SSM2044-based filters), K4 and K5. These machines follow different synthesis approaches. The K4 use subtractive synthesis based on sampled waveforms, the K1 and K5 are additive synthesizers. The K1 is one of the first popular synthesizers that has no filter whatsoever; all sounds are made by stacking wave samples and applying frequency modulation. The K3 is hybrid in the sense that it does employ additive synthesis for waveform generation, but these waveforms are static and cannot be modulated as in a true additive synthesizer; instead, waveshaping is done using a low-pass filter, therefore characterizing this machine as a subtractive synthesizer. Uniquely for their price range, all instruments feature aftertouch. Kawai also manufactured rack versions of most of these instruments, Kawai Q-80 MIDI sequencer (1988), and an external MIDI programming device, MM-16 MIDI Mixer (MIDI processor with slider controllers).

Later developments resulted in Kawai Spectra KC10 (1990) based on the K4 engine, along with a group of original multitimbral instruments, including Kawai PH-50 Pop Keyboard and its half-rack version PHm, and XS-1 sound module (1989), and a group of General MIDI (GM) compatible instruments including Kawai KC20 GM Sound Keyboard (early 1990s), GMega sound module (early 1990s) as an update of previous XS-1, and K11 (1993) based on GMega and K1, etc.

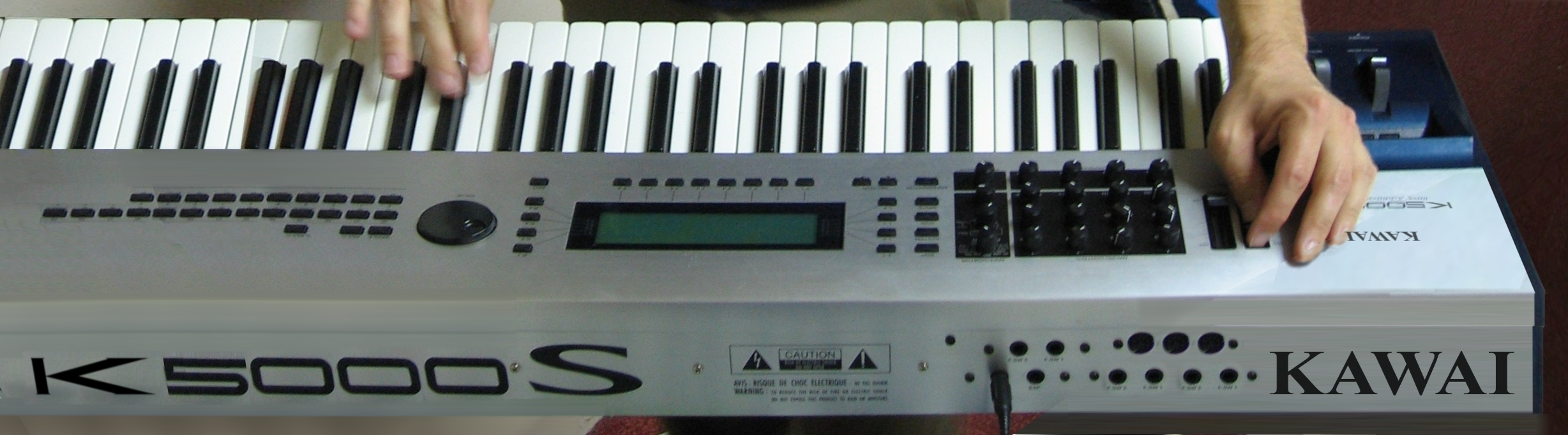
Kawai K5000S (c. 1996)

In 1996 Kawai released the K5000, an advanced additive synthesizer that greatly improved on the K5 and is now regarded as one of Kawai's very best instruments. It was manufactured in three versions: K5000S, which had 16 knobs for real-time control and an arpeggiator, K5000W which added a sequencer but lacked both the knobs and the arpeggiator, and the K5000R, a rack version with an arpeggiator, but no sequencer and no knobs. A Knobs Macro Box was sold separately for use with the W and R models. Kawai originally planned to release K5000X, which would combine the features of the S and W models with a 76-key keyboard and enhanced memory, but this was cancelled in the late '90s due to bad sales. Shortly thereafter the company stopped producing synthesizers.

=== Drum machines ===
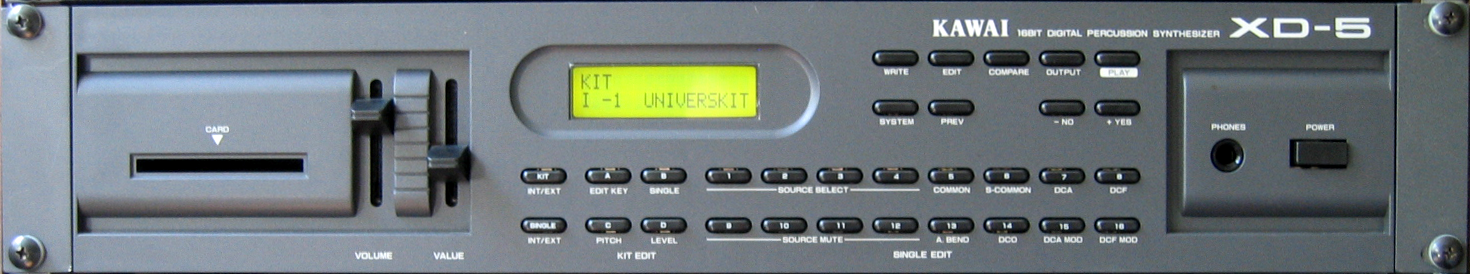
Kawai XD-5 (1989)

The Kawai R-100 and R50 drum machines were both manufactured from around 1987. The Kawai XD-5, a drum synthesizer based on the K4 engine, was produced in 1989-1990.

=== Organs ===
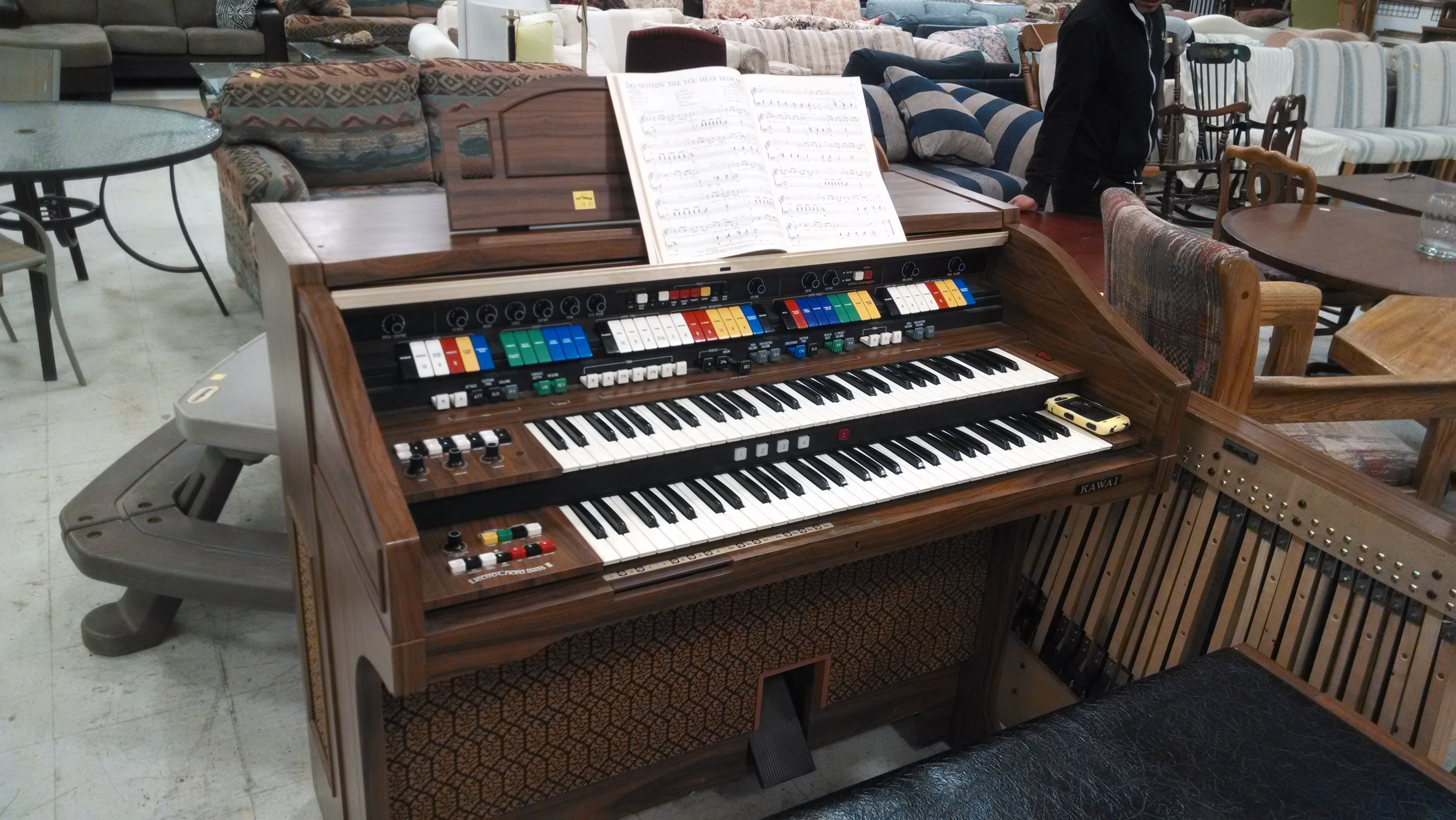
Kawai MORE series M-650 (1978)

Kawai produces a line of electronic organs under the name "Dreamatone". Kawai also owns Lowrey organs. Kawai previously offered the MORE series, a home organ product line applying the high-end technology of their theater models, T-50 and T-30. The MORE series was merged into "Dreamatone" family in fall 1979.

=== Other products ===
The company also manufactures MIDI controllers.

=== Guitars ===
The company was a prolific builder of guitars and basses after acquiring Teisco in 1967. Kawai discontinued the Teisco brand in 1969 internationally in favour of its own brand "Apollo", but retained it domestically until 1977. The F-series from approximately late 1970 to 1990 have a neck thru guitar design. Guitar production ceased in 2007.

Kawai was a major OEM builder of Fernandes Guitars in the 1980s and 1990s.

During the 1980s the company partnered with Schaller GmbH to produce the "Rockoon" range of guitars until 1990.

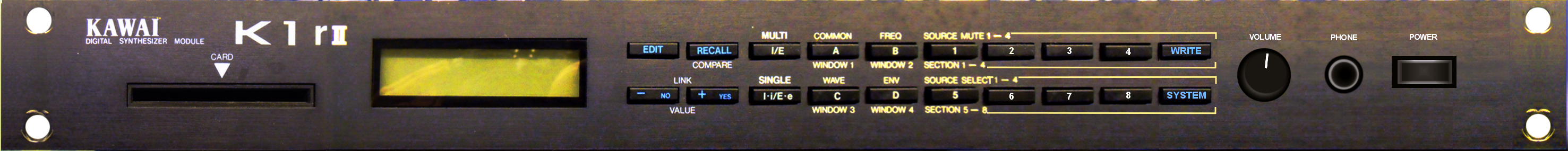
Kawai K1rII (1989)

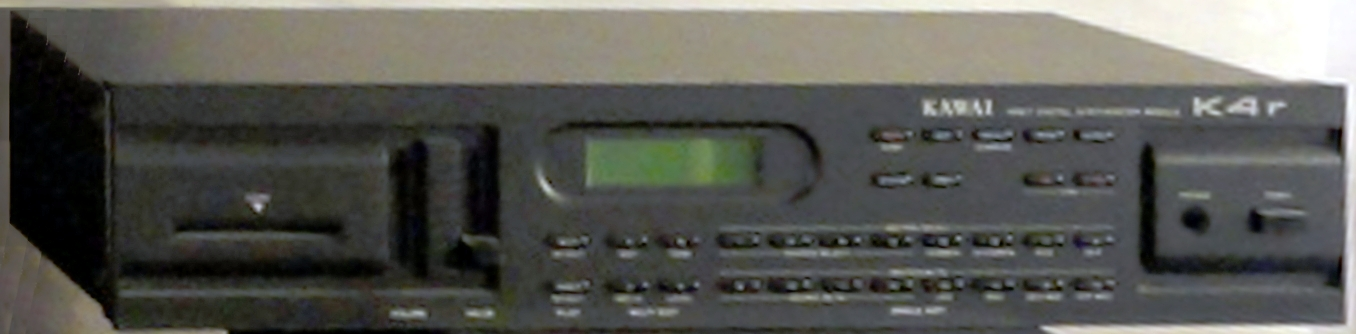
Kawai K4r (1989)

== See also ==
- Kent guitars (manufactured by Kawai)
- Fernandes Guitars (manufactured by Kawai)
- Teisco (acquired by Kawai)
