= Kawai K5000 =

Series of digital synthesizers

K5000
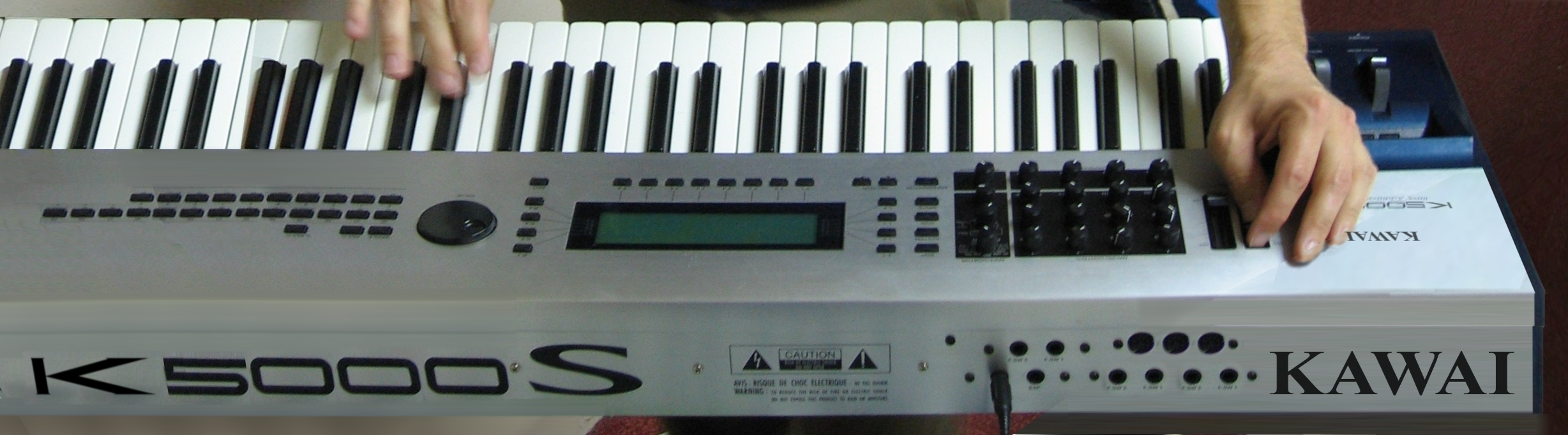
- Kawai K5000S synthesizer
- Manufacturer: Kawai
- Dates: 1996 - 1999

Technical specifications
- Polyphony: 32 voices
- Timbrality: K5000S, K5000R: 4-part multi-timbral; K5000W: 32-part multi-timbral
- Oscillator: Digital Additive Synthesis plus PCM samples Harmonics: 64 per source Waveforms: 689 (123 synth, 341 GM, 225 drums) Note: only K5000W features GM sounds
- LFO: 2 (one for formant filter, one can be freely routed to other destinations)
- Synthesis type: PCM Subtractive synthesis and Additive synthesis
- Attenuator: 1 ADSR per part, with key scale and velocity
- Aftertouch expression: Yes
- Velocity expression: Yes
- Effects: 4 effects algorithms with 32 different effects

Input/output
- Keyboard: 61 keys
- External control: MIDI K5000S, K5000R: 4-part multi-timbral; K5000W: 32-part multi-timbral

The Kawai K5000 is a series of digital synthesizers / music workstations manufactured by Kawai Musical Instruments of Japan.

== History ==
The first of the series was the K5000W keyboard workstation introduced in 1996. Soon afterwards the K5000S was introduced, followed its rackmounted sibling the K5000R. In Japan, Kawai stopped production of all models of the K5000 by the summer of 1999, although they were officially discontinued months earlier in other parts of the world. The K5000 is credited as one of the few commercial synthesizers to use additive synthesis. Even today this technology is mostly found in software synthesizers. It was Kawai's second attempt at additive synthesis. The first was the Kawai K5 nearly ten years earlier.

== Synthesis ==
A K5000 sound is composed of up to six different layers, each of which could use the "advanced additive" synthesis engine or perform fairly standard subtractive synthesis using the internal PCM sound bank. Each source that used additive synthesis could use up to 64 harmonics per source (tuned in a harmonic series, each with their own amplitude envelope) and had its own formant filter that could be modulated by an LFO or its own envelope. The standard digital filter, available with both additive and subtractive synthesis, is known for its rather extreme self-oscillation at higher resonance settings. Another useful feature is that most functions of the synthesizer can be tied to velocity, location of a note on the keyboard, and MIDI controllers, allowing for timbral variation in response to player dynamics.

== Models ==
The K5000W and the K5000S both have the same semi-weighted 61-key keyboard. There are pitch and assignable modulation wheels. The keys are velocity sensitive with aftertouch that can be programmed to control various parameters.

=== Kawai K5000W ===
The K5000W was intended as a songwriting workstation. Its Compose Mode includes a 40-track MIDI sequencer, Automatic Phrase Generator (APG, an auto-arranger type function) and has two supplemental sound banks not available to the K5000S/K5000R: BBank and GM (General MIDI), which both feature Sample-based sounds and 12dB/Oct High- and Low-Pass Resonant filters as compared to the Additive (ADD) bank's 24dB/Oct High- and Low-Pass resonant filters.

=== Kawai K5000S ===
The K5000S was intended for live performance and it includes sixteen realtime control knobs (four of them assignable), a programmable arpeggiator, two assignable front panel buttons, a damper and (assignable) expression pedal, and two assignable foot switches.

=== Kawai K5000R ===
The K5000R has the same functionality as the K5000S, but is controlled via MIDI.
