= Kawai K1 =

1988 synthesizer

K1
- Manufacturer: Kawai
- Dates: 1988
- Price: K1 £595 GBP; K1r £395 GBP

Technical specifications
- Polyphony: 16/8 note (depending on mode)
- Timbrality: 8 part
- Oscillator: 4 PCM
- LFO: 1 (triangle, sawtooth, square and random)
- Synthesis type: Digital PCM Waveform Playback
- Filter: No
- Attenuator: ADSR
- Aftertouch expression: Yes
- Velocity expression: Yes
- Storage memory: 64 single-patches or 32 combo-patches
- Hardware: CPU: NEC D78310G; DAC: NEC μPD6355G

Input/output
- Keyboard: 61 keys
- Left-hand control: Left wheel - pitch bend Right wheel - modulation.
- External control: MIDI In, out, thru, sustain pedal input

The Kawai K1 is a 61 key synthesizer manufactured in 1988 by Kawai. It is an entry-level and low fidelity synthesizer and not as feature rich as the Kawai K4 and was released to compete with the Roland D50 and Korg M1 synthesizers. The patch memory can be doubled with a DC-8 memory card which was available separately.

== Features ==
The K1 features 256 8-bit PCM waveforms (204 additive waveforms and 52 acoustic samples), AM (Ring modulation), and a 16×2 character LCD.

=== Modes ===
The four modes of operation are:

- Mono
- Polyphonic
- Split
- Unison

=== Percussion ===
The K1 includes drum kits and sounds (acoustic and electronic kits, cymbals as well as some tuned percussion), so can be used to create full rhythm backing when sequenced. The K1II model has 32 percussion sounds.

== Mostly known for ==
Percussive sounds, organs, haunting pads, strings and FM bass sounds and acoustic bass.

=== Notable users ===
- Bile
- Cirrus
- Drexciya
- EMF
- LFO
- Lab 4
- Pochonbo Electronic Ensemble (band)

== Kawai K1R and K1M ==
A 1U rackmount version of the K1 was produced called the K1r. Also a module version called K1M was released. Both have the same synth engine as the keyboard version.

== See also ==
- Kawai K4
