= Kawai R-100 =

Drum machine

R-100
- Manufacturer: Kawai
- Dates: 1987
- Price: £645 GBP $795 US

Technical specifications
- Polyphony: 8 voices
- Timbrality: 8 part
- Synthesis type: ROM
- Storage memory: 100 patterns, 100 songs, 3500 notes
- Hardware: 8 bit M50734 SP

Input/output
- Keyboard: 8 velocity sensitive pads
- External control: MIDI In, out, thru, Tape I/O

The Kawai R-100 is a digital sample-based drum machine released in 1987 by the Kawai Musical Instruments company. It is the big brother of the Kawai R-50.

== Sounds and features ==
The R-100 includes samples of the following sounds, all recorded with a resolution of 12-bit/32kHz: 3 bass drums, 3 snare drums, 3 tom drums (high, mid, and low), 2 ride cymbals, 2 crash cymbals, 1 china cymbal, hi-hat (open and closed), cowbell, handclap, shaker, agogo, conga, tambourine, timbale, and claves.

The R-100 features eight individual outputs, as well as stereo and mono outputs for routing to an external mixing desk. Its onboard sequencer can hold up to 3,500 notes. Unlike the Kawai R-50, it has velocity sensitive pads.

The separately available RC-16 cartridge can store a backup of all data from the R-100's current internal memory.

== Notable users ==
- Jan Hammer
- Steve Smith
- Al Jourgensen
- Michael Jackson (Bad)
