= Technos Acxel =

Digital resynthesizer released in 1987

The Technos Acxel is a resynthesizer, launched by the Quebec-based company Technos in 1987. It was the first dedicated resynthesizer machine, and was also capable of additive synthesis. The Acxel was invented by Pierre Guilmette, the operational design was a Nil Parent realization, and the system was developed at Technos, a company owned and directed by Pierre Guilmette, Nil Parent and other partners.

== Operation ==
The Technos Acxel may look similar in operation to a sampler, although its workings were very different and the sound structure is accessible. Where samplers used an A/D converter to convert a continuously-variable analogue signal into digital data, the Axcel worked on the premise that any sound, no matter how harmonically complex, could be broken down into a finite number of sine waves, and that these sine waves could be individually altered to fundamentally change the sound, producing what Technos founder Nil Parent termed re-synthèse.

A project for an "Acxel II" was started in 2008 by a Quebec based company, Idarca-Audio Inc. The Acxel II was designed by Pierre Guilmette, and was an evolution of the original Acxel, with many new features, in particular additional signal processing and higher overall performance. Idarca-Audio was bankrupted in 2010, before they could ship any units, due to lack of funding.

Utilising a FFT (Fast Fourier Transform) analysis, sounds inputted into the Acxel were broken down into a number of variable-amplitude and variable-frequency sine waves, up to a maximum of 1024. Once sounds had been processed by the Acxel, all the constituent waves could be pitched up or down by the same factor, which had the effect of increasing the pitch of the sound without affecting length, or introducing any of the digital artefacts that traditional samplers did (for example, pitching all waves up by a factor of 2 would raise the overall pitch of the sound by 1 octave, without affecting length. Using a traditional sampler, pitching a sound up by 1 octave would result in it being halved in length).

The Acxel also had the capability to synthesise sounds from scratch. The same 1024 sine oscillators, that in fact can be of various waveforms including of draw-able shape, which were used to resynthesize sounds could also be used for additive synthesis. You can either take Analyzed sounds and modify them. A large palette of parameters and controls is accessible, on the same manner if you start from scratch or from analysis, and in Real Time:

- Draw waveforms directly onto its LED matrix display with finger-tip (a feature once offered by the Fairlight CMI almost 10 years previously, albeit using a video monitor and light-pen).
- Draw dual Spectrum type shapes for Amplitudes, Frequencies (with separate: Integer / Decimal parts, and Envelope Variation), Phases - Corresponding to each parameter the base spectrum and the MIDI control spectrum.
- Draw dual Envelopes to each Oscillator Parameter: Amplitude, Frequency - Corresponding to base envelopes and MIDI control envelopes, independent on each oscillator.
- Draw dual Envelopes to each voice parameter: Volume, FM, Color, LFO1, LFO2 - Corresponding to base envelopes and MIDI control envelopes. Draw waveforms for LFOs.
- You can also apply a digital type of filtering named COLOR filter. With center frequency envelope. The frequency is expressed as harmonic number, then you apply the filtering on the same manner at 100 Hz or 2000 Hz or 5000 Hz. With possible selection of harmonic numbers to be filtered or not (example to keep fundamental). With drawn envelope and filter shape (Low pass, High pass, Band, User-drawn response curve - for example Comb type shape)
- FM (Frequency Modulation) envelopes is also accessible and applied on the created sound structure (or analyzed).
- Other controls and editing: Timbre interpolation, Time stretch / expansion, extended MIDI controls (programmable control curves), muting elements, chorus.

== Description ==
The word Acxel is short for "acoustical element" (as pixel is short for "picture element".)

The Acxel consists of 2 components: The "Grapher" (graphic console) and the "Solitary" (Rackmount containing the Synthesis and Analysis hardware). Standard - 256 Oscillators (8 voices), up to 1024 Oscillators (32 voices).

Instead of having an LCD or CRT screen, the Axcel has a bank of 2114 LEDs mounted behind finger-sized conductive sensors (a smaller number were also used on the Technos 16$\pi$ synthesizer main panel). All data readouts, and a lot of data input, are processed using this innovative method.

The 16$\pi$ is the Acxel ancestor (1984 - never in production, 4 units delivered at that time), introducing the concept but limited to 64 Oscillators, including a keyboard.

The Acxel never found mainstream favour and was never a commercial success, due to its high cost, and relative difficulty of use. Only about 35-40 units were sold from 1987 to 1990. As a result of this, Acxels today are very rare. Consequently, resale prices can be quite expensive. Although the Acxel never replaced traditional samplers, its legacy lives on in modern-day resynthesizers such as VirSyn's Cube, Camel Audio's Cameleon 5000, and Image-Line's Harmor.
