= Kawai K4 =

K4
- Manufacturer: Kawai
- Dates: 1989
- Price: K4 £895 GBP; K4r £695 GBP

Technical specifications
- Polyphony: 16 voices
- Timbrality: 8 part
- Oscillator: 2
- LFO: 1 - Sample & Hold, Saw Up, Square, Triangle
- Synthesis type: PCM ROMpler
- Filter: 2 - 12dB Slope (2-pole), Low Pass, Resonance
- Attenuator: ADSR
- Aftertouch expression: Yes
- Velocity expression: Yes
- Storage memory: 64 RAM slots
- Effects: 32 types including: Reverb, Reverse Gate, Normal Delay, Stereo Pan Delay, Chorus, Flanger, Over Drive.
- Hardware: 8-bit UPD 78310G CPU

Input/output
- Keyboard: 61 keys
- Left-hand control: Mod - Wheel, Pitch -Wheel
- External control: MIDI [Pedal - Sustain, Velocity, Pedal - Volume

The Kawai K4 is a 61 key synthesizer manufactured in 1989 by Kawai. It contains several features beyond those offered on Kawai K1, adding resonant filters and a DAC PCM wavetable. The K4 incorporated a new type of synthesis called Digital Multi Spectrum.

== Features ==
- 2 line LCD screen
- 256 16 bit, 32 kHz internal waveforms (96 Digital Cyclic waveforms and 160 PCM samples)
- Drum section (61 drum patches)

Interestingly, the K4 uses a system that splits 16 bit samples between two read only memory (ROM) chips, while reserving a third chip for 8 bit sound samples that naturally have more noise (such as cymbals, snares, and other noisier percussion) in order to have more functionality for a cheaper manufacturing cost.

== Kawai K4R ==
A 2U rack mounted module was also produced by Kawai. It has six separate audio outputs in addition to standard left/right stereo outs and a headphone socket. The effects are removed in the rack mounted version as it is presumed outboard effects will be used with the unit.
