= Kawai Q-80 =

Music sequencer

The Kawai Q-80 by Kawai Musical Instruments in 1989, is a music sequencer that has a built in 2DD floppy disk drive for storage. It allows playback, editing, and recording via its MIDI connections. There is a battery backup to hold the configuration when the unit is powered down. The tempo can be set from 40-250 beats per minute.

== Active quantisation ==
Only corrects the notes that are completely out of time with the rest of the track, for a more natural feel and less robotic to the performance.

== Connections ==
- MIDI in, out and Thru.
- Tape sync in and out
- Metronome
- Footswitch input

== Storage ==
Using the units internal S-RAM the Q-80 can hold;

- A total of 26,000 notes, this consists of 10 songs (up to 32 tracks, 15,000 notes per track)
- 100 motifs per song (similar to a pattern in a drum machine)
