= Tibia (organ pipe) =

A tibia is a sort of organ pipe that is most characteristic of a theatre organ.

Tibia pipes are generally made of wood, stopped, from 16' (Occasionally 32') with the top octave pipes (above 1/2', or 6" made of metal, stopped, and pipes from 1/4', 3" made of metal and open.

The mouth is cut very high, and the pipes have little harmonic development - the sound approaches that of a sine wave.

There is usually a tremulant on the wind for Tibia pipes - the increase and decrease of wind pressure gives "life" to the sound.

== See also ==
- Encyclopedia of Organ Stops
