= Solitaire (musician) =

American singer-songwriter

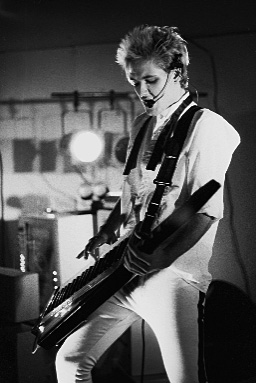
- Solitaire performing live at Maryland Institute College of Art, 1985

Background information
- Born: James L. Callahan; 1965 (age 60–61); Baltimore, Maryland, United States
- Died: December 16, 2024
- Genres: Pop, electropop, synthpop, new wave, computer music
- Instruments: Keyboards, microcomputer, drum machine Analog synthesizers, keytar, Vocals
- Years active: 1983–1986
- Formerly of: Toy Soldier

Solitaire was an American one-man project with pioneering live-electronics created by James L. Callahan (born 1965) from Baltimore, Maryland, United States; who performed, wrote and recorded solo synth-pop music between 1983 and 1986. James Callahan (aka Solitaire) was the first “truly computerized” artist in the Baltimore area. As Solitaire, Callahan played keyboards and electronic drum machines as a one-man show.

== Live electronics overview ==
Solitaire's performance system was manufactured by Sequential Circuits (SCI). It consisted of the Sequential Circuits Six-Trak a six-voice, polyphonic, analogue synthesizer that was among the first MIDI instruments designed to be used with a computer. The computer and software allowed Solitaire to program the Six-Trak sequencer and SCI's Drumtraks to form one of the earliest known MIDI-based [live] performance systems. In 1984 the system used by Solitaire was said to "create instruments that have never been heard before," at that time "musicians [were] just beginning to tap its potential". However, by modern computer standards the electronic rhythm section used by Solitaire was crude and had several limitations. For example, the SCI Model 64 Sequencer was limited to six voice sequencing. To play back more songs required sequences be saved to disk (loading of disk sequences had to be done live, on stage, during the performance).

== Live performance reaction ==
From 84–85 Solitaire performed at numerous clubs and colleges in the USA mid-Atlantic region, both as a headliner and as a supporting act for bands such as MCA recording artists The Ravyns. Many of Solitaire's early club performances were documented by rock journalists from Maryland Musician Magazine. Solitaire was frequently mentioned in Maryland Musician articles such as the Baltimore-centric Red Rocker Report and the Sammie’s Jammin’ column who wrote, ”it all sounded damn good especially since he [Solitaire] was the only one on stage along with a monster stack of keyboards and one in hand . . . bravo." Solitaire's live performances continued to be met positively and in 1986 Solitaire [James Callahan] was voted Maryland's "Best keyboard player" in the Maryland Musician Magazine 2nd Annual Readers poll.

== Recordings ==
In 1985 Solitaire released the 7-inch single "System Overload" b/w "Nothing Left to Say". The single enjoyed limited success locally but was later "discovered" by European DJ's and became a highly sought after record. Upon its initial release a regional critic described it as "an ambitious but somewhat compromised mixture of new wave. 'System Overload' is top heavy with beat box and electronic percussions [with] a synth laden metronomic melody". In contrast 'Nothing Left to Say' is a wistful little ballad whose lyrics preen with a clever romanticism". In 1986 Callahan played keyboards and recorded for the new wave rock band Toy Soldier, whose album Forward March was produced by Rob Fahey (Ravyns) and recorded at Sheffield Studios, MD. The group released the single "Never my Love" on the Texas-based Yellow Rose Records Label. In late 1986 his music career was halted due to ill health, after being diagnosed with Crohn's disease.

== Musical comparisons ==
Solitaire was often compared to English solo synth-pop artists of the period such as the UK’s Thomas Dolby and Howard Jones. From a performance technology standpoint Solitaire more closely mirrored Jones who during his Human's Lib tour 1983–84 decided to forgo a band and perform solo using only automated accompaniment. Howard Jones notes that during early performances he, “triggered sequencers live on stage whilst playing and singing, something that no one had done before". Although Jones's claim is not disputed, Solitaire may be considered the first American synth-pop act who can claim similar “technological firsts”: playing and singing on stage completely solo, accompanied only by a computer, 5 ¼-inch floppy disks and synthesizers. With health issues looming and without chart support from his debut single, Solitaire’s notoriety never reached that of his UK solo synth counterparts. Despite heavy tour schedules up until 1986 and national promotion in American publications such as Star Hits, Solitaire’s international recognition as a synth-pop pioneer would not come for another twenty years.

== Renewed interest ==
2001 saw the first reappearance of Solitaire’s music. Solitaire attributes the international interest to his longtime friend and collaborator Tony Prescott (keyboardist for Liverpool 1980s synth-pop band Cook da Books). Prescott helped Solitaire gain global exposure by introducing his early works to Australian sound engineer Mark Woods. Woods known for his indie label e-pop, and work as sound engineer for 1980s Aussie-based bands such as INXS and Men at Work mastered and released a number of previously unreleased Solitaire tracks on a CD entitled "Solitaire: Selected Tracks” on Woods own e-pop label in Australia. The Solitaire CD released by e-pop renewed international interest in Solitaire. The original 7-inch single "System Overload" was "discovered" by European DJs and became a highly sought after record. Solitaire landed a distribution deal with EraRecords, Netherlands who re-released the original 7" recording.

International attention for Solitaire continued when his 1984 recording "After Darkness" was released on the 2007 Anna Logue Records compilation LP Echoes From Our Past, in Germany. German critics appreciated Solitaire's early dark electronic synth-pop. One European critic wrote, "The American solo project Solitaire is bringing his despair into sound with a catchy dark electropop". In 2002, Solitaire formed Solitaire Music, a studio project, with keyboardist Paul Demme releasing records into the 2000s, including the Baltimore release entitled Retrophaze: Digital Folklore in 2004. In 2008, SolitaireMusic.Net released a 12 song digital LP entitled Solitaire – Best Of: 83–86 on various MP3 download and streaming media sites. However James Callahan’s ill health once again came into issue, and SolitaireMusic.Net closed permanently in 2008, shortly after the Best of 83–86 MP3 was released.

== Discography ==
System Overload / Nothing Left To Say.
Distribution: ERA Records
Published: MOR-0002 East Coast Sound Lab
Format: Vinyl, 7", 45 RPM
Country: US/Netherlands
Released: 1985
Produced: James Callahan
Engineered: Brent Mingle
Tracks: System Overload b/w Nothing Left To Say

Solitaire: Selected Tracks 84–86
Label: E-pop – EPOPSOL1
Format: CD, Re-mastered, Out Of Print
Country: Australia
Released: 2001
Production Credits: Callahan/Czerwinski/Mingle/Woods
Tracks: 1. System Overload 2. Nothing Left To Say 3. Don't Be Afraid Of The Rain 4. Åsa 5. After Darkness (Cassette Single) 6. Explain Yourself Again 7. Just More Reasons To Cry 8. This Nightmare Don't Ever Sleep

RETROPHAZE: Digital Folklore
Label: SolitaireMusic.Net
Format: CD
Country: USA (Regional – Baltimore, MD)
Released: 2004
Credits: Callahan/Demme
Tracks: 1. High Fashion Radio 2. When She Moves 3. Control Freak 4. It Don’t Matter 5. Lullaby 6. Feed Me Technology 7. How Many Times? 8. Hey Gabrielle 9. Time to Escape 10. Moon Mobiles 11. Retrophaze (The Man That Time Forgot) 12. Welcome to the New Millennium

VARIOUS ARTISTS "Echoes from our Past"
LP+7” Anna Logue Records ANNA 009.2007/ANNA 009-7.2007
Country: Germany
Track: b4 Solitaire – After Darkness

Solitaire: Best of 83–86
Label: SolitaireMusic.Net
Distribution:Amazon MP3- ASIN B0037J984K, iTunes, TuneCore
Format: MP3
Country: Worldwide
Released: 2008
Production Credits: Callahan/Czerwinski/Mingle/Woods
Tracks: 1. System Overload 2. Nothing Left to Say 3. Don't Be Afraid of the Rain (Re-mix) 4. Åsa 5. You Treat Me Like a Silent Movie 6. After Darkness 7. Explain Yourself Again 8. 1940 London 9. All I Can Do 10. Just More Reasons to Cry (Demo) 11. Dick Loves Jane (Demo) 12. This Nightmare Don't Ever Sleep (Demo)
