= Akai AX60 =

Polyphonic analogue synthesizer

AX60
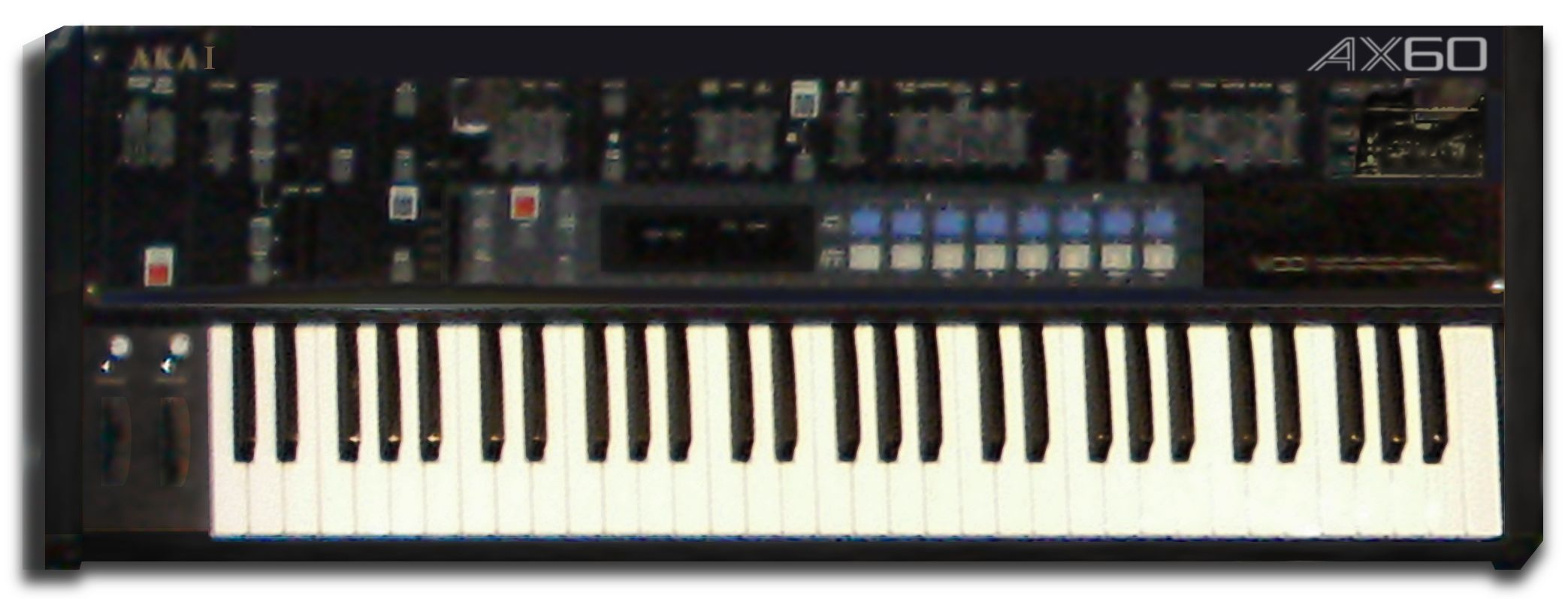
- AKAI AX60
- Manufacturer: Akai
- Dates: 1986

Technical specifications
- Polyphony: 6 voices
- Timbrality: 2
- Oscillator: 1 VCO per voice
- LFO: 1x4 waveforms (saw, square, triangle, random), 1 dedicated PWM
- Synthesis type: Analogue subtractive
- Filter: 24 dB/octave 4-Pole resonant lowpass; highpass

Input/output
- Keyboard: 61 keys
- Left-hand control: pitch & modulation wheels
- External control: MIDI, sustain pedal, program footswitch

The AX60 is a polyphonic analogue keyboard synthesizer manufactured by Akai Professional in the mid-1980s. It was Akai's answer to the popular Roland Juno series synthesizers. The AX60 uses voltage-controlled analogue oscillators and filter circuitry based on the Curtis Electromusic CEM 3394 integrated circuit.

== Features and cabinet ==
This electronic keyboard is a 61 key, 6-voice bitimbral polyphonic, analogue synthesizer. Its keys are unweighted and not velocity-sensitive. Its features include bitimbral splitting of the keyboard, Unison mode, a variable arpeggiator with a "Hold" function for latching the arpeggiator, multi-mode BBD chorus effect, and voice input for several of Akai's then-contemporary samplers such as the S612, S700, and X7000. It has 64 memory locations for sounds ("patches"). The instrument has limited MIDI implementation, and lacks the ability transmit or receive Sysex data.

=== Front panel ===
The AX60's front panel is designed with a single control for each of its editable parameters, often including LEDs to indicate the parameter's status. In addition to the plethora of control faders, there is a small LED screen which indicates patch numbers and other information to the user. A series of switches controls the chorus effect, arpeggiator, modulation routing, and other features. The position of every switch and fader is stored digitally in one of 64 patches which can be recalled or edited at any time.

=== Back panel ===
The back panel has quarter-inch jacks for recording data to cassette tape, sustain and program change footpedal jacks, MIDI in, out and "thru" DIN connectors, stereo quarter-inch audio outputs (with a cable plugged into only the left output the stereo signal is summed to mono), a quarter-inch stereo headphone jack, a quarter-inch arpeggiator trigger input jack, and memory protect and power switches. It also has special inputs for use with Akai's S612, S700, and X7000 samplers, allowing you to run the samplers' voices through the AX-60's analog filters and envelopes.

=== Keyboard ===
The keyboard is five octaves (61 notes, C to C), is unweighted, and is not velocity-sensitive.

== Voice architecture and sound programming ==
=== Voice architecture ===
The AX60 uses voltage-controlled analogue oscillators and filter circuitry based on the Curtis Electromusic CEM 3394 integrated circuit. The same chip is also used in several Sequential Circuits synthesizers, including the Six-Trak, Max, Multi-Trak, and Split-8.

Each of the AX-60's 6 synthesizer voices consist of a single oscillator, which can output sawtooth, triangle, square, or sawtooth+triangle waveforms. Pulse-width modulation is available for all four waveforms, with a dedicated low-frequency oscillator (LFO) for this parameter. Pitch can be modulated by an LFO or the VCF cutoff frequency ADSR envelope generator, while the VCA volume has its own envelope generator.

The AX-60's filter is a 4-pole (24 dB/octave) resonant lowpass type. A feature of the filter section rarely available in an analog synthesizer is the ability to modulate the filter's cutoff frequency using the VCO signal, resulting in timbres ranging from a slightly growly character to sounds that can be similar to some of the metallic FM sounds typically produced by the Yamaha DX7, depending on the VCO waveform, the VCF cutoff frequency, and the amount of filter resonance.

The AX-60's VCF's cutoff frequency can be made to track the keyboard, allowing higher notes to sustain their harmonic content.

The modulation section of this synthesizer features a low-frequency oscillator with four available waveforms (triangle, square, sawtooth and random) which can be routed to VCF cutoff, VCO pitch or VCA amplitude. These also have a programmable delay before their effect sets in. A second LFO is dedicated to pulse-width modulation, and only its rate and depth are programmable.

There is also a programmable output level for each patch, to help balance loud and soft sounds, a multi-mode arpeggiator, a white noise generator, and a multi-mode chorus effect similar to the Roland Juno series chorus. Notably missing from the voice architecture is portamento.

=== Performance controls ===
The AX-60 is bitimbral with 6 voice polyphony. The keyboard can be "split" to play two patches independently. The assignment of voices to each split side can be 0-6, 2-4, 4-2, or 6-0. Splits where no voices can be used for half of the keyboard are useful when the AX-60 is expanded with an Akai sampler. Each side of the split responds to a different MIDI channel.

In addition to "split" mode, the AX-60 can be made to operate monophonically in Unison mode, where all 6 voices are "stacked" on each key, resulting in rich, powerful timbres.

Also available: Sustain/foot pedal inputs, pitch bend wheel and modulation wheel with adjustable "depth." The pitch bend wheel can also be used to modulate the VCF cutoff frequency.

=== MIDI implementation ===
The AX60 has relatively limited MIDI implementation. It can send/receive data on 1 of 16 MIDI channels, with the ability to send/receive on two different channels simultaneously when the keyboard is "split." Aside from note data, the AX60 also sends/receives pitch bend wheel and modulation wheel input via midi CC. Although the front-panel controls can not be edited through CC, automating pitch bend and modulation amount can be useful. In addition, the pitch-bend wheel can be set to affect VCF Cutoff frequency rather than pitch, and in this way the VCF frequency can also be automated.

== Other information ==
=== Accessories ===
The AX-60 is designed to be compatible with Akai's S-612, S-700, X-7000, S-900 and S-950 samplers, allowing sampled sounds to be used as a second oscillator, passed through the AX-60's unique voice architecture.

=== Literature ===
Peter Forrest's "A-Z of Analogue Synthesisers" lists the Akai AX-60 as #75 in Forrest's list of the Top 100 Synthesizers. According to Forrest, the AX-60 handily tops the Roland Juno 106 (#94) and Juno 60 (#95).
