= SpecDrum =

Drum machine peripheral for the ZX Spectrum home computer

The SpecDrum was an inexpensive drum machine, designed by musicians Alan Pateman and Peter Hennig between 1984 and 1985, and unlike most contemporary drum machines, was a peripheral for the popular ZX Spectrum home computer. It was released under licence by Cheetah Marketing in 1985. It was notable for its low retail price of £29.95, when standalone alternatives typically cost around £250-£300 for a similar functionality. They sold about 30 000 units the first year making it one of the best selling hardware add-ons for the ZX Spectrum.

== Description ==
The device connected to the expansion bus on the ZX Spectrum. The ZX Spectrum ran software that was used to program rhythm patterns, and chain these into songs. Patterns and songs could then be loaded and saved onto cassette tape. The SpecDrum was an 8-voice machine (i.e. it allowed the user to load 8 different percussion samples). However it only had 3 output channels (i.e. maximum polyphony of 3 samples at a time) - the first channel could trigger the 'bass drum' voice, the second channel was used for the three snare/tom voices, and the third channel for the remaining four samples.

The standard kit consisted of bass drum, snare drum, mid and low tomtoms, cowbell, hi-hat open and closed and hand claps. The sound has been compared to that of a LinnDrum. Cheetah also sold 'electro', 'afro' and 'Latin' kits on cassette, which could be loaded into the ZX Spectrum in place of the standard one. In addition, software was available enabling the user to sample and build their own custom kits. The SpecDrum could also, in principle, be synchronized to other musical equipment, using a sync pulse sent and received from the ZX Spectrum's "ear" and "mic" audio input/output sockets.

Artists who have used it include Nigel Powell who used for a 1987 demo with The Illiterate Hands that also featured Jonny Greenwood (of Radiohead) on keyboards and harmonica and vocals by Andy Yorke (of Unbelievable Truth). The SpecDrum was followed by the Cheetah MD8, which did not require a separate computer.

An Android app version has been created by the designer Alan Pateman in 2016. There is also a software version for Microsoft Windows.

== See also ==
- RAM Music Machine
