= Cheetah Sound Sampler =

Defunct sound sampler program used in the 1980s

The Cheetah Marketing Sound Sampler (1986) was an Analogue to Digital converter system that attached to the system bus connection of the ZX Spectrum home computer.

== Product ==
The sampler included a microphone with an audio preamplifier, an 8 bit analogue to digital converter and an audio output amplifier for impedance matching purposes. The software for the unit was written entirely in Z80 machine code and featured a menu driven interface and an ability to play back a recorded sound shifted over a two octave frequency range using the computer's rudimentary keyboard as a piano keyboard. Although Cheetah Marketing publicised the unit as suitable for home or professional use, reviews identified that the cheapness of the equipment, the lack of polyphony, and the capabilities of the software limited the usefulness of the product to the amateur market.

Accompanying the main software package, the designers Speedwell Software created a real-time sound processing unit that contained a frequency shifter, sound chopper or Dalek voicebox effect, Echo, reverb and a very strange sound effect called a Bubbelizer that was a failed attempt at a phase shifter.

== Legacy ==
The Cheetah Sound Sampler, although crude and cheap, was one of many such electronic devices that introduced home computer owners to the possibilities of digital recording and the principles of electronic music that was, at the time, still reserved for a relative few who had the resources to buy expensive professional and semi-professional equipment.

The Sound Sampler sold relatively few units due to stiff competition from contemporary manufacturers and the poor build quality of the product.
