= RAM Music Machine =

Add-on for the ZX Spectrum and Amstrad CPC 464/664

RAM Music Machine was a hardware add-on for the ZX Spectrum and Amstrad CPC 464/664 released in 1986. It was more advanced than the earlier SpecDrum and it could play melody samples, drum patterns or be used as an echo machine. One could sample sounds in 19,444 samples a second and use them. It also had MIDI ports to connect to synthesisers. By 1990 the hardware was advertised with a price of £50.

Notable users include a teenaged Aphex Twin.

== See also ==
- SpecDrum
