= Cheetah Marketing =

Former UK music products company

Cheetah International
- Formerly: Cheetah Marketing
- Defunct: 1993
- Products: Electronic music-related hardware
- Parent: Cannon Street Investments

Cheetah Marketing was a United Kingdom-based company that produced electronic music-related hardware products and software for home computer systems during the 1980s. They later changed their name to Cheetah International Ltd.

Based in Cardiff, Cheetah was run by two brothers, Howard and Michael Jacobson, but owned by Cannon Street Investments. The company was closed in 1993 when the UK recession badly hit the share price of its owners. After this Chris Wright and Nick Owen bought the music products division and formed Soundscape Digital Technology Ltd. The joysticks and other computer peripheral products division went to another company in the Cannon Street group.

== Products ==
The company originally produced joysticks like the infrared R.A.T. for the Commodore 64 and ZX Spectrum computers and later branched out into music peripherals and stand-alone musical equipment for price conscious home users.

Among their offerings were the SpecDrum (a sample-based drum machine), a Cheetah Sound Sampler, a Cheetah Midi Interface, and in the later, 8-bit/16-bit drum machines, music sequencer, and a range of music keyboards (including polyphonic analog / digital synthesizers and rack mount modules).

Joysticks and peripherals included the Cheetah 125, Cheetah 125 Plus, Mach 1, and an infrared joypad.

Cheetah's range of music products expanded quickly during the 1980s when they began to work with external designers. Among these were Chris Wright, who later founded Soundscape Digital Technology, Ian Jannaway, who later founded Novation Digital Music Systems and Mike Lynch, who later founded Autonomy Corporation.

Cheetah also distributed the Gamate handheld console in the UK.

== Music products ==
- Cheetah SpecDrum - drum machine add-on for the Sinclair ZX Spectrum
- Cheetah MQ8 - performance sequencer.
- Cheetah MD8 - 8 bit MIDI drum machine.
- Cheetah MD16 - 16 bit MIDI drum machine (also with the rack mount variants MD16R, MD16RP) - designed by Chris Wright and Nick Robbins.
- Cheetah MK5/7VA - 5 or 7 octave MIDI keyboard controllers - designed by Speedwell Software
- Cheetah Master Series 5/7/7P - MIDI keyboard controller, 5 or 7 octaves with piano weighted keyboard action - designed by Chris Wright and Nick Robbins.
- Cheetah Master Series 7000/8000 - MIDI keyboard controllers with advanced features, 5 or 7 octaves and piano weighted keyboard action (shown at the NAMM Show in 1993 but never manufactured due to demise of Cheetah - 6 prototypes are known to exist) - designed by Chris Wright and Nick Robbins.
- Cheetah MS800 - Digital wave synthesizer - designed by Lynett Systems (Mike Lynch).
- Cheetah SX16 - 16 bit sampler - designed by Lynett Systems (Mike Lynch).
- Cheetah MS6 - 6 voice polyphonic analogue synthesizer - designed by Ian Jannaway
