= Drumtraks =

Drum machine

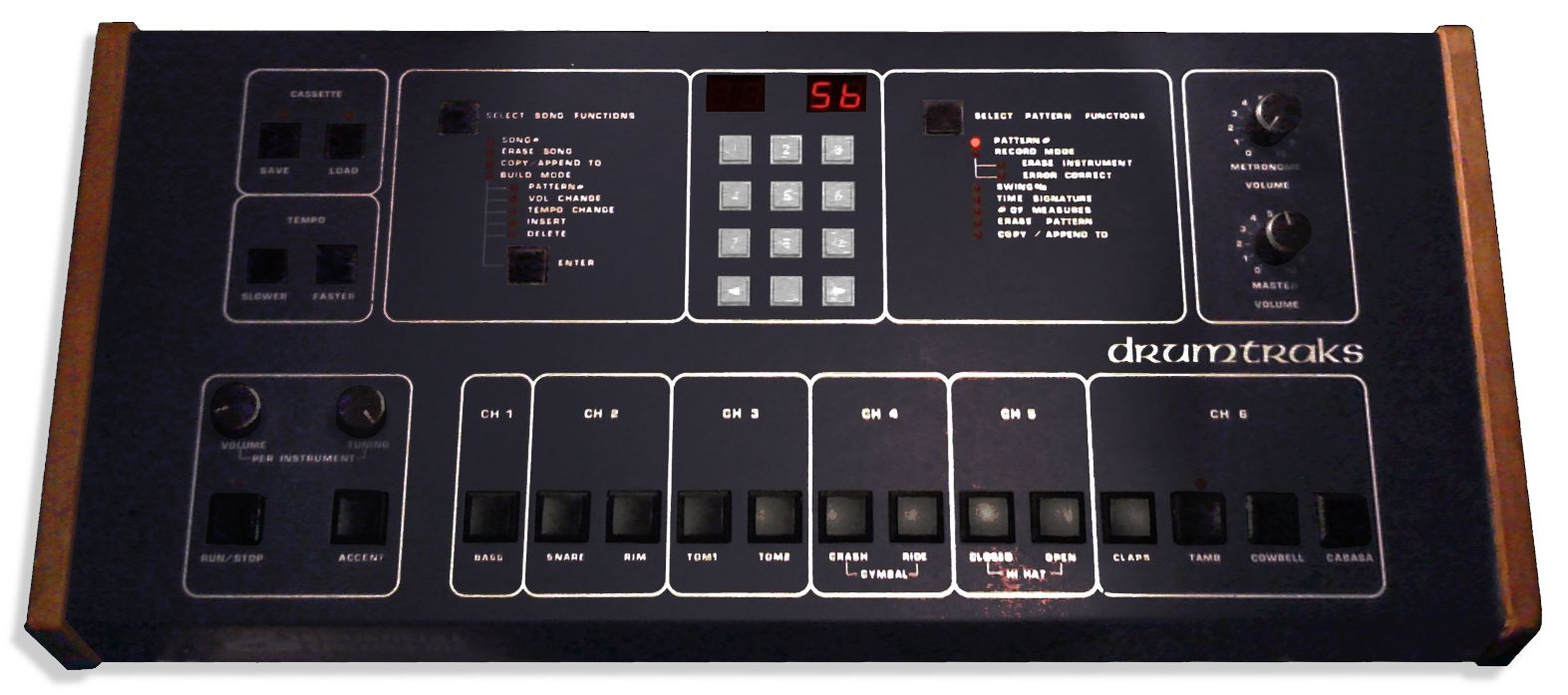
- Drumtraks front panel
- Manufacturer: Sequential
- Dates: 1984
- Price: $1,295 USD £995 GBP

Technical specifications
- Timbrality: 13 voices
- Synthesis type: 8-bit digital samples
- Effects: Individual level and tuning for all sounds

Input/output
- Keyboard: 13 plastic pads

The Drumtraks, also referred to as the Drumtraks Model 400, is a drum machine released by the American company Sequential in 1984. It was one of first drum machines on the market to feature MIDI control, after the Roland TR-909.

== Development ==
The Drumtraks was Sequential's first drum machine and its first sample-based product. It was designed at Sequential in San Jose by Dave Smith, Steve Salani, Donna Murray, and Chris Meyer, who wrote the MIDI software. The units were built in Japan to keep the price down.

== Features ==
The Drumtraks features 13 percussion voices: bass drum, snare, snare rim, toms 1 and 2, crash and ride cymbal, open and closed hi-hat, handclaps, tambourine, cowbell, and cabasa. Each drum sound is saved on a read-only memory (ROM) microchip, and sounds may be changed by opening the front panel and exchanging the chips. Each sound has a trigger button allowing it to be played live or programmed in record mode. The user could program tempos and tempo changes in song mode, and set the volume and pitch of each sound. Individual patterns can be up to 100 bars long and up to 100 patterns can be chained together in song mode, but total memory is limited to only 3,289 events, and pitch changes also use up memory; the unit has a display that shows the user the percent of memory remaining as it is programmed.

The built-in trigger buttons are not touch-sensitive, but the Drumtraks responds to velocity inputs via the built-in MIDI interface, allowing the user to vary the loudness of the drum sounds using an external velocity-sensitive MIDI controller. The MIDI interface allows it to synchronize its tempo with MIDI devices such as music sequencers and other drum machines, and the Drumtraks also has configurable clock inputs and outputs allowing it to synchronize with many older electronic music devices that lack MIDI.

The Drumtraks will accept LinnDrum ROM sound chips.

== Release ==
The Drumtraks was released at the beginning of 1984 and retailed for $1,295 in the US (equivalent to $4,013 in 2025) and £995 in the UK (equivalent to £3,241 in 2025). Sequential manufactured approximately 8,000 Drumtraks units.

Sequential promoted the combination of the Six-trak analog synthesizer, Drumtraks and the Model 64 sequencer as the 'Traks Music System', which formed a MIDI workstation allowing analog synth sequencing with sampled drum sounds and computer control.

Daft Punk used a Drumtraks on "Short Circuit", from their 2001 album Discovery. Tame Impala used one on their 2015 album Currents.
