= Drum machine =

Electronic musical instrument that creates percussion sounds

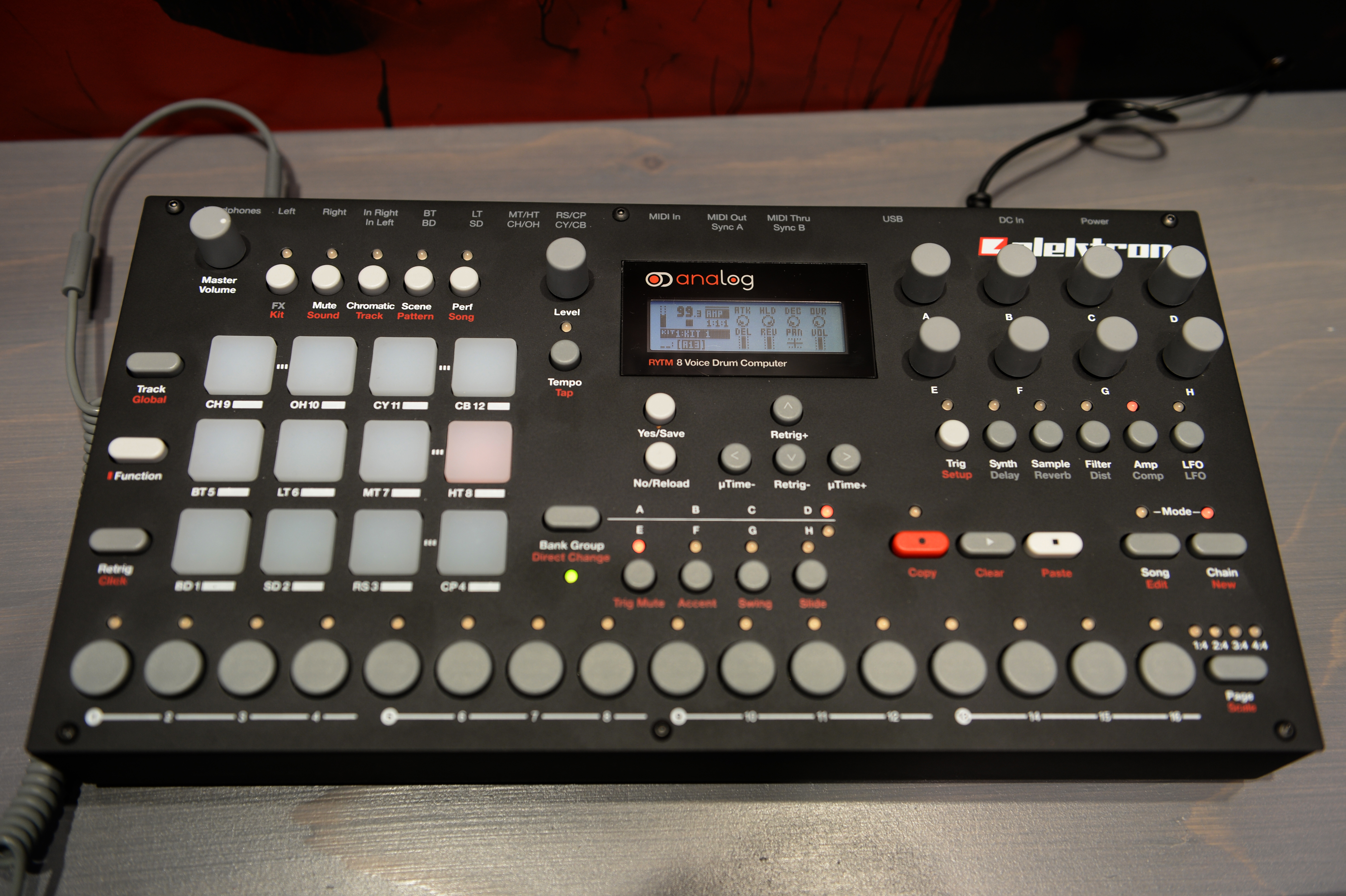
Elektron Analog RYTM drum machine

A drum machine is an electronic musical instrument that creates percussion sounds, drum beats, and patterns. Drum machines may imitate drum kits or other percussion instruments, or produce unique sounds, such as synthesized electronic tones. A drum machine often has pre-programmed beats and patterns for popular genres and styles, such as pop music, rock music, and dance music. Most modern drum machines made in the 2010s and 2020s also allow users to program their own rhythms and beats. Drum machines may create sounds using analog synthesis or play prerecorded samples.

While a distinction is generally made between drum machines (which can play back pre-programmed or user-programmed beats or patterns) and electronic drums (which have pads that can be struck and played like an acoustic drum kit), there are some drum machines that have buttons or pads that allow the performer to play drum sounds "live", either on top of a programmed drum beat or as a standalone performance. Drum machines have a range of capabilities, which go from playing a short beat pattern in a loop, to being able to program or record complex song arrangements with changes of meter and style.

Drum machines have had a lasting impact on popular music in the 20th century. The Roland TR-808, introduced in 1980, significantly influenced the development of dance music, especially electronic dance music, and hip-hop. Its successor, the TR-909, introduced in 1983, heavily influenced techno and house music. The first drum machine to use samples of real drum kits, the Linn LM-1, was introduced in 1980 and was adopted by rock and pop artists including Prince and Michael Jackson. In the late 1990s, software emulations began to overtake the popularity of physical drum machines housed in a separate plastic or metal chassis.

== History ==
=== Rhythmicon (1930–1932) ===
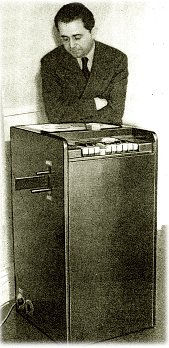
Rhythmicon (1932) and Joseph Schillinger, a music educator

In 1930–32, the innovative and hard-to-use Rhythmicon was developed by Léon Theremin at the request of Henry Cowell, who wanted an instrument that could play compositions with multiple rhythmic patterns, based on the overtone series, that were far too hard to perform on existing keyboard instruments. The invention could produce sixteen different rhythms, each associated with a particular pitch, either individually or in any combination, including en masse, if desired. Received with considerable interest when it was publicly introduced in 1932, the Rhythmicon was soon set aside by Cowell.

=== Chamberlin Rhythmate (1957) ===
In 1957, Harry Chamberlin, an engineer from Iowa, created the Chamberlin Rhythmate, which allowed users to select between 14 tape loops of drum kits and percussion instruments performing various beats. Like the Chamberlin keyboard, the Rhythmate was intended for family singalongs. Around 100 units were sold.

=== Wurlitzer Side Man (1959) ===
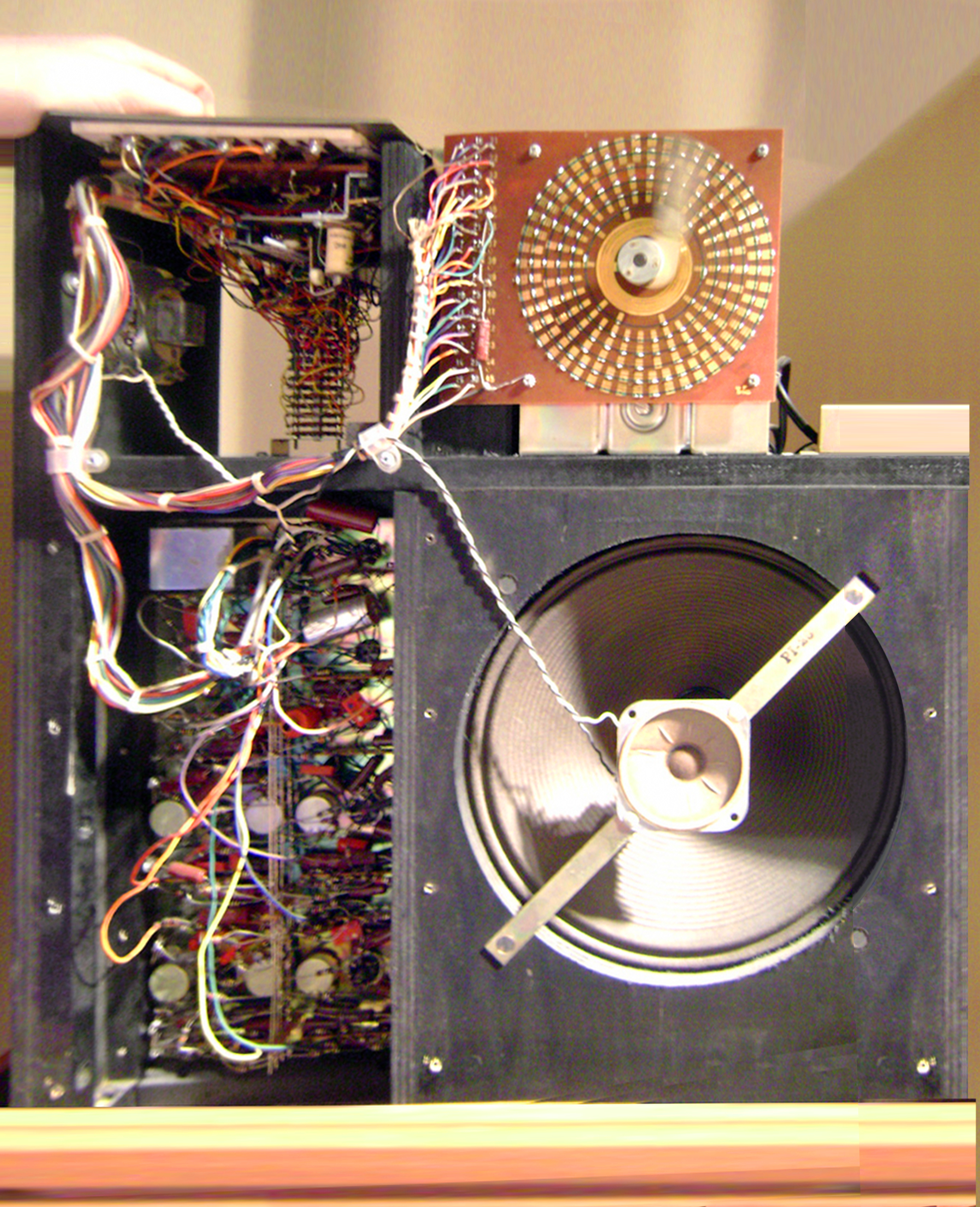
Wurlitzer Side Man (1959, inner view)

In 1959, Wurlitzer released the Side Man, which generates sounds mechanically by a rotating disc, similar to a music box. A slider controls the tempo (between 34 and 150 beats per minute). Sounds can also be triggered individually through buttons on a control panel. The Side Man was a success and drew criticism from the American Federation of Musicians, which ruled in 1961 that its local jurisdictions could not prohibit Side Man use, though it could not be used for dancing. Wurlitzer ceased production of the Side Man in 1969.

=== Raymond Scott (1960–1963) ===
In 1960, Raymond Scott constructed the Rhythm Synthesizer and, in 1963, a drum machine called Bandito the Bongo Artist. Scott's machines were used for recording his album Soothing Sounds for Baby series (1964).

=== First fully transistorized drum machines – Seeburg/Gulbransen (1964) ===
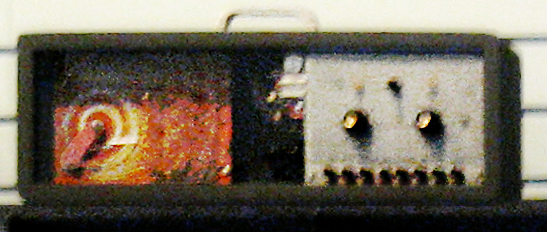
Seeburg/Gulbransen Rhythm Prince using a mechanical wheel, as seen on bailed out left panel

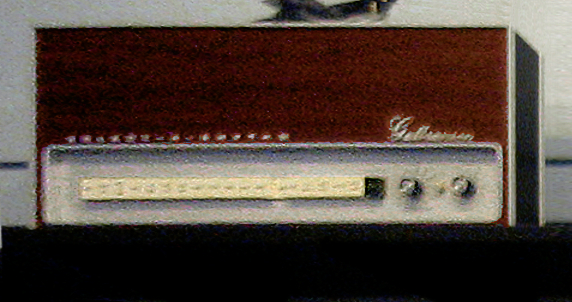
Seeburg/Gulbransen Select-A-Rhythm, an earliest fully transistorized rhythm machine

During the 1960s, the implementation of rhythm machines had evolved into fully solid-state (transistorized) from early electro-mechanical with vacuum tubes, and also size was reduced to desktop size from earlier floor type. In the early 1960s, a home organ manufacturer, Gulbransen (later acquired by Fender) cooperated with an automatic musical equipment manufacturer Seeburg Corporation, and released early compact rhythm machines Rhythm Prince (PRP), although, at that time, these sizes were still as large as small guitar amp head, due to the use of bulky electro-mechanical pattern generators. Then in 1964, Seeburg invented a compact electronic rhythm pattern generator using "diode matrix" (U.S. patent 3,358,068 in 1967), and fully transistorized electronic rhythm machine with pre-programmed patterns, Select-A-Rhythm (SAR1), was released. As a result of its robustness and enough compact size, these rhythm machines were gradually installed on the electronic organ as an accompaniment of organists and finally spread widely.

==== Keio-Giken (Korg), Nippon Columbia, and Ace Tone (1963–1967) ====
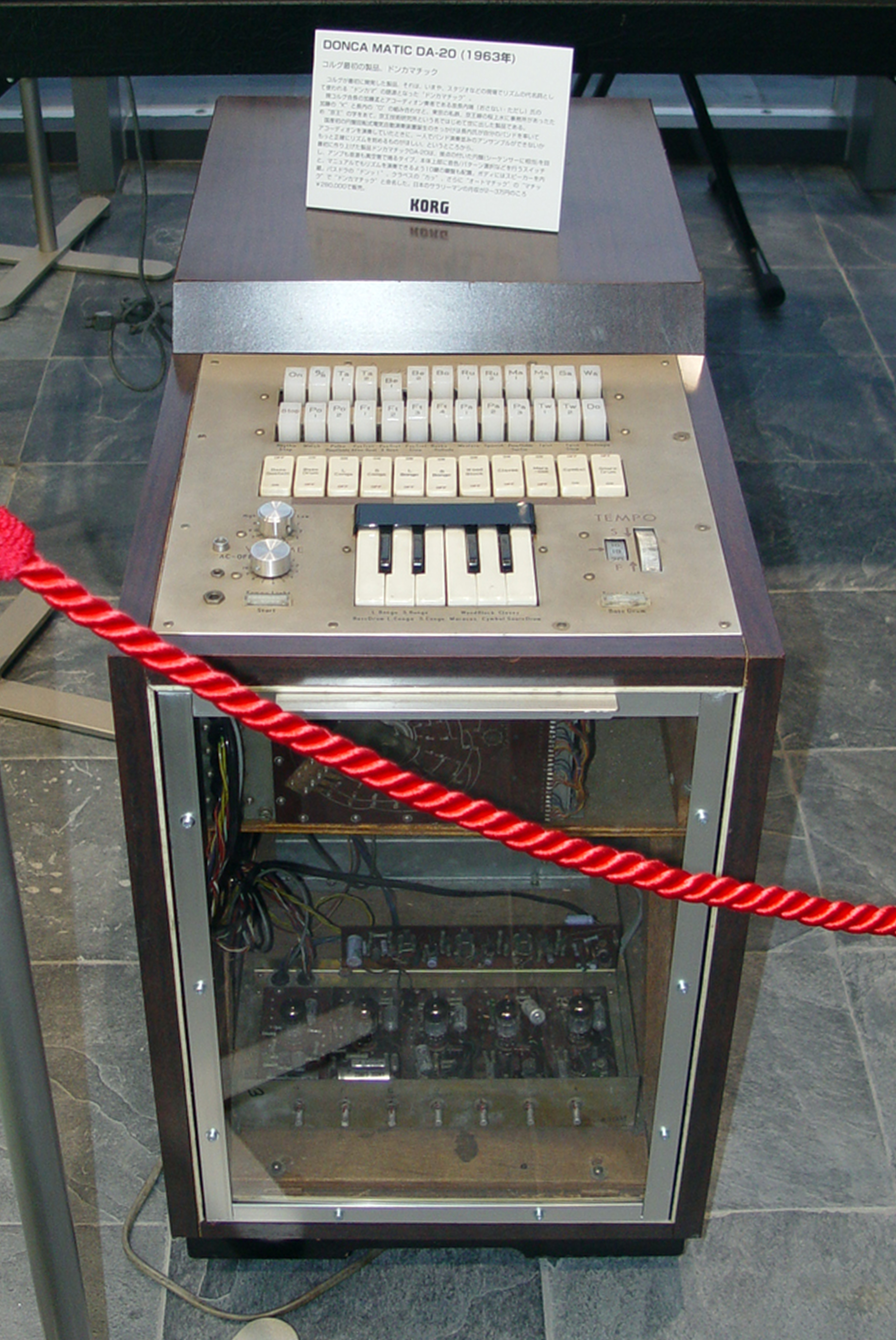
Korg Donca-Matic DA-20 (1963)

In the early 1960s, a nightclub owner in Tokyo, Tsutomu Katoh, was consulted by a notable accordion player, Tadashi Osanai, about the rhythm machine he used for accompaniment in the club, a Wurlitzer Side Man. Osanai, a graduate of the Department of Mechanical Engineering at the University of Tokyo, convinced Katoh to finance his efforts to build a better one. In 1963, their new company Keio-Giken (later Korg) released their first rhythm machine, the Donca-Matic DA-20, using vacuum tube circuits for sounds and a mechanical wheel for rhythm patterns. It was a floor-type machine with a built-in speaker, and featured a keyboard for manual play, in addition to the multiple automatic rhythm patterns. Its price was comparable with the average annual income of Japanese at that time.

Next, their effort was focused on the improvement of reliability and performance, along with size and cost reductions. Unstable vacuum tube circuits were replaced with reliable transistor circuits on the Donca-Matic DC-11 in the mid-1960s. In 1966, the bulky mechanical wheel was also replaced with a compact transistor circuit on the Donca-Matic DE-20 and DE-11. In 1967, the Mini Pops MP-2 was developed as an option for the Yamaha Electone (electric organ), and Mini Pops was established as a series of compact desktop rhythm machines. In the United States, Mini Pops MP-3, MP-7, etc. were sold under the Univox brand by the distributor at that time, Unicord Corporation.

In 1965, Nippon Columbia filed a patent for an automatic rhythm instrument. It described it as an "automatic rhythm player which is simple but capable of electronically producing various rhythms in the characteristic tones of a drum, a piccolo and so on." It has some similarities to Seeburg's slightly earlier 1964 patent.

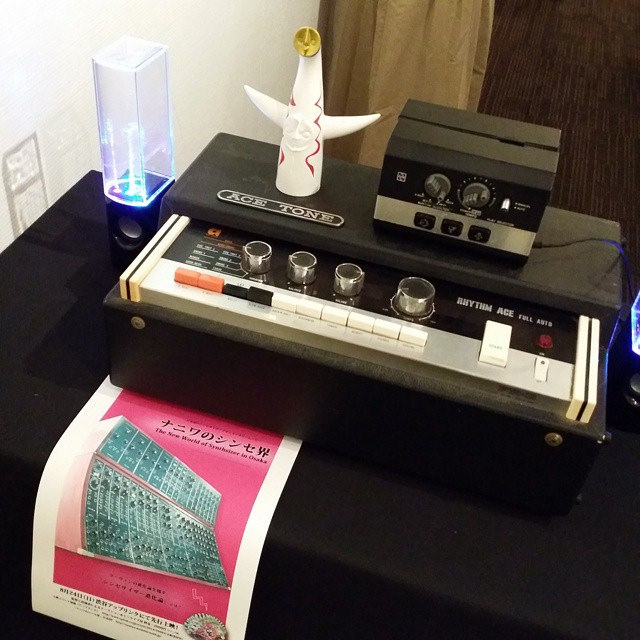
Ace-Tone Rhythm Ace FR-3

In 1967, Ace Tone founder Ikutaro Kakehashi (later founder of Roland Corporation) developed the preset rhythm-pattern generator using diode matrix circuit, which has some similarities to the earlier Seeburg and Nippon Columbia patents. Kakehashi's patent describes his device as a "plurality of inverting circuits and/or clipper circuits" which "are connected to a counting circuit to synthesize the output signal of the counting circuit" where the "synthesized output signal becomes a desired rhythm."

Ace Tone commercialized its preset rhythm machine, called the FR-1 Rhythm Ace, in 1967. It offered 16 preset patterns, and four buttons to manually play each instrument sound (cymbal, claves, cowbell and bass drum). The rhythm patterns could also be cascaded together by pushing multiple rhythm buttons simultaneously, and the possible combination of rhythm patterns were more than a hundred (on the later models of Rhythm Ace, the individual volumes of each instrument could be adjusted with the small knobs or faders). The FR-1 was adopted by the Hammond Organ Company for incorporation within their latest organ models. In the US, the units were also marketed under the Multivox brand by Peter Sorkin Music Company, and in the UK, marketed under the Bentley Rhythm Ace brand.

=== Early preset drum machine users ===
A number of other preset drum machines were released in the 1970s, but early examples of their use can be found on The United States of America's eponymous album from 1967–8. The first major pop song to use a drum machine was "Saved by the Bell" by Robin Gibb, which reached #2 in Britain in 1969. Drum machine tracks were also heavily used on the Sly & the Family Stone album There's a Riot Goin' On, released in 1971. Sly & the Family Stone was the first group to have a number #1 pop single that used a drum machine: that single was "Family Affair".

The German krautrock band Can also used a drum machine on their songs "Peking O" and "Spoon". The 1972 Timmy Thomas single "Why Can't We Live Together"/"Funky Me" featured a distinctive use of a drum machine and keyboard arrangement on both tracks. Another early example of electronic drums used by a rock band is Obscured by Clouds by Pink Floyd in 1972. The first album on which a drum machine produced all the percussion was Kingdom Come's Journey, recorded in November 1972 using a Bentley Rhythm Ace. French singer-songwriter Léo Ferré mixed a drum machine with a symphonic orchestra in the song "Je t'aimais bien, tu sais..." in his album L'Espoir, released in 1974. Miles Davis' live band began to use a drum machine in 1974 (played by percussionist James Mtume), which can be heard on Dark Magus (1977). Osamu Kitajima's progressive psychedelic rock album Benzaiten (1974) also used drum machines.

=== Programmable drum machines ===
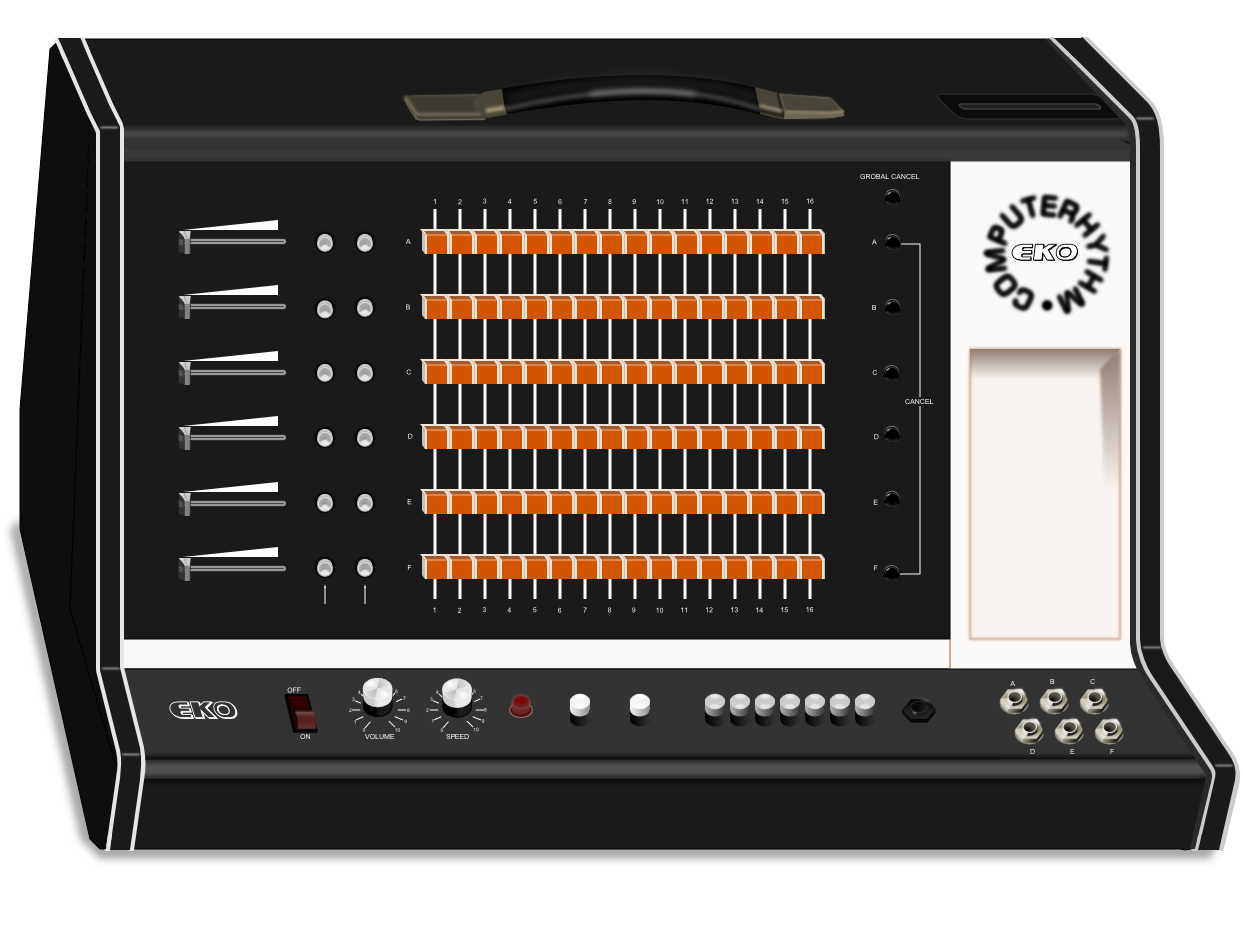
Eko ComputeRhythm (1972), one of the first programmable drum machines

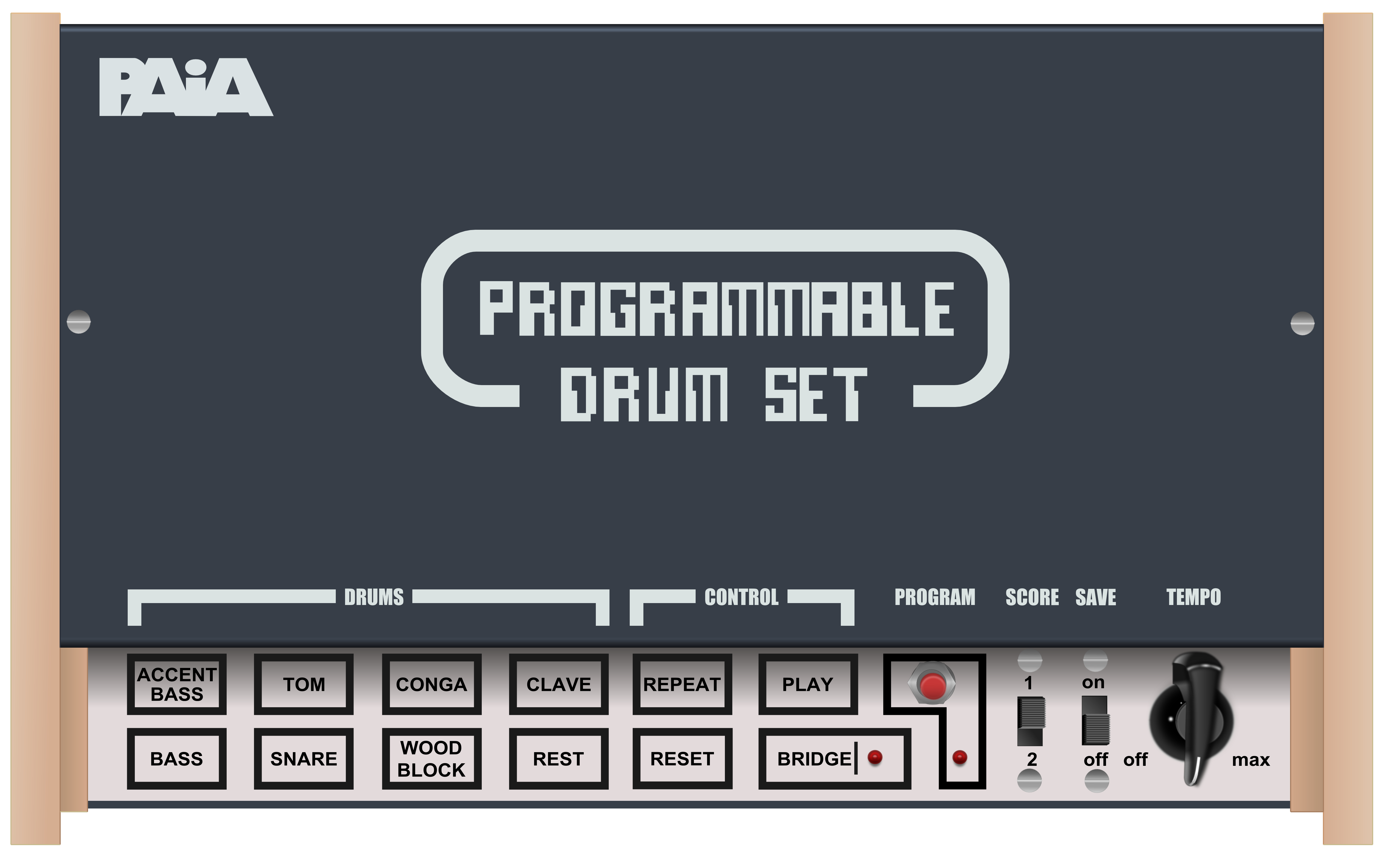
PAiA Programmable Drum Set (1975), one of the earliest electronically programmable drum machines

In 1972, Eko released the ComputeRhythm, which was one of the first programmable drum machines. It had a 6-row push-button matrix that allowed the user to enter a pattern manually. The user could also push punch cards with pre-programmed rhythms through a reader slot on the unit.

Another stand-alone drum machine released in 1975, the PAiA Programmable Drum Set was also one of the first programmable drum machines, and was sold as a kit with parts and instructions which the buyer would use to build the machine.

In 1975, Ace Tone released the Rhythm Producer FR-15 that enables the modification of the pre-programmed rhythm patterns. In 1978, Roland released the Roland CR-78, the first microprocessor-based programmable rhythm machine, with four memory storage for user patterns. In 1979, a simpler version with four sounds, Boss DR-55, was released.

Steely Dan recording engineer Roger Nichols developed a 125kHz/12bit sampling drum machine and audio sampler in 1978 that he named Wendel, which was used on the Gaucho album in January 1979 for drums and percussion.

=== Drum sound synthesis ===
A key difference between such early machines and more modern equipment is that they use sound synthesis rather than digital sampling in order to generate their sounds. For example, a snare drum or maraca sound would typically be created using a burst of white noise, whereas a bass drum sound would be made using sine waves or other basic waveforms. This meant that while the resulting sound was not very close to that of the real instrument, each model tended to have a unique character. For this reason, many of these early machines have achieved a certain "cult status" and are now sought after by producers for use in production of modern electronic music, most notably the Roland TR-808.

=== Digital sampling ===
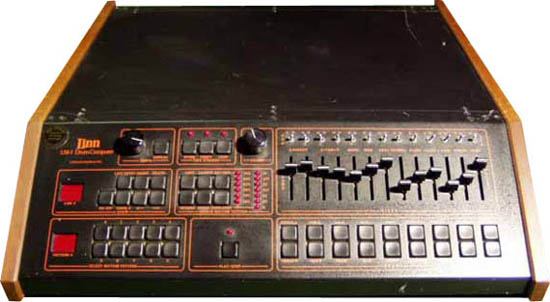
Linn LM-1 (1980)

The Linn LM-1 Drum Computer, released in 1980 at $4,995 (equivalent to $19,500 in 2025), was the first commercially released drum machine to use digital samples. It also featured rhythmic concepts such as swing factors, shuffle, accent, and real-time programming. Only about 500 were ever made, but its effect on the music industry was extensive. Its distinctive sound almost defines 1980s pop, and it can be heard on hundreds of hit records from the era, including The Human League's Dare, Gary Numan's Dance, Devo's New Traditionalists, and Ric Ocasek's Beatitude. Prince bought one of the first LM-1s and used it on nearly all of his most popular albums, including 1999 and Purple Rain.

Many of the drum sounds on the LM-1 were composed of two chips that were triggered at the same time, and each voice was individually tunable with individual outputs. Due to memory limitations, a crash cymbal sound was not available except as an expensive third-party modification. A cheaper version of the LM-1 was released in 1982 called the LinnDrum. Priced at $2,995 (equivalent to $10,000 in 2025), not all of its voices were tunable, but crash cymbal was included as a standard sound. Like its predecessor the LM-1, it featured swappable sound chips. The LinnDrum can be heard on records such as The Cars' Heartbeat City and Giorgio Moroder's soundtrack for the film Scarface.

It was feared the LM-1 would put every session drummer in Los Angeles out of work and it caused many of L.A.'s top session drummers (Jeff Porcaro is one example) to purchase their own drum machines and learn to program them themselves in order to stay employed. Linn even marketed the LinnDrum specifically to drummers.

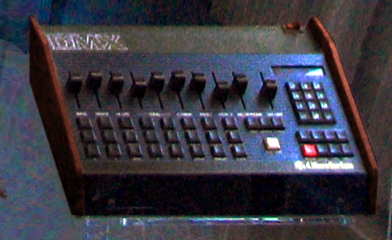
Oberheim DMX (1981)

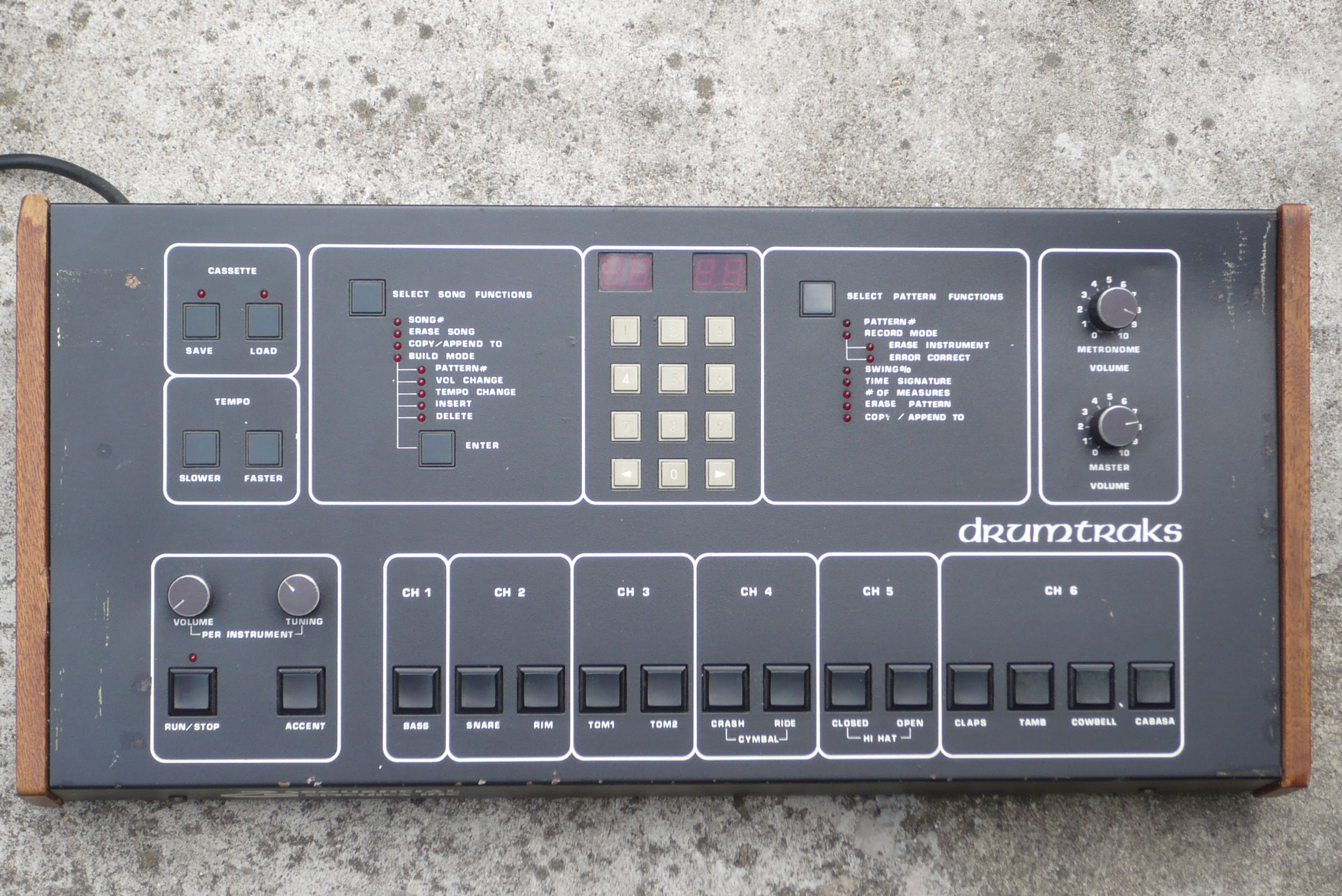
SCI Drumtraks (1984)

Following the success of the LM-1, Oberheim introduced the DMX, which also featured digitally sampled sounds and a "swing" feature similar to the one found on the Linn machines. It became very popular in its own right, becoming a staple of the nascent hip-hop scene.

Other manufacturers soon began to produce machines, e.g. the Sequential Circuits Drumtraks and Tom, the E-mu Drumulator and the Yamaha RX11.

In 1986, the SpecDrum by Cheetah Marketing, an inexpensive 8-bit sampling drum external module for the ZX Spectrum, was introduced, with a price less than £30, when similar models cost around £250.

=== Roland TR-808 and TR-909 ===
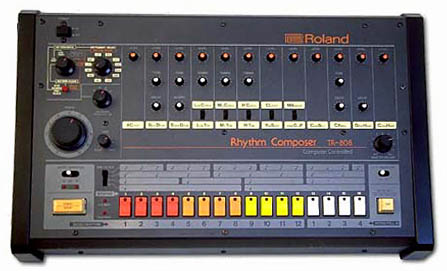
Roland TR-808 Rhythm Composer (1980)

In 1980, the Roland Corporation launched the TR-808 Rhythm Composer. It was one of the earliest programmable drum machines, with which users could create their own rhythms rather than having to use preset patterns. Unlike the more expensive LM-1, the 808 is completely analog, meaning its sounds are generated non-digitally via hardware rather than samples (prerecorded sounds). The 808 was nevertheless the first fully programmable drum machine with which users could program a complete percussion track from beginning to end, complete with breaks and rolls.

Launched when electronic music had yet to become mainstream, the 808 received mixed reviews for its unrealistic drum sounds and was a commercial failure. Having built approximately 12,000 units, Roland discontinued the 808 after its semiconductors became impossible to restock.

Over the course of the 1980s, the 808 attracted a cult following among underground musicians for its affordability on the used market, ease of use, and idiosyncratic sounds, particularly its deep, "booming" bass drum. It became a cornerstone of the emerging electronic, dance, and hip-hop genres, popularized by early hits such as Marvin Gaye's "Sexual Healing" and Afrika Bambaataa and the Soulsonic Force's "Planet Rock". The 808 was eventually used on more hit records than any other drum machine; its popularity with hip-hop in particular has made it one of the most influential inventions in popular music, comparable to the Fender Stratocaster's influence on rock. Its sounds continue to be used as samples included with music software and modern drum machines.

The 808 was followed in 1983 by the TR-909, the first Roland drum machine to use MIDI, which synchronizes devices built by different manufacturers. It was also the first Roland drum machine to use samples for some sounds. Like the 808, the 909 was a commercial failure, but had a lasting influence on popular music after cheap units circulated on the used market; alongside the Roland TB-303 bass synthesizer, it influenced the development of electronic genres such as techno, house and acid.

=== Later machines ===
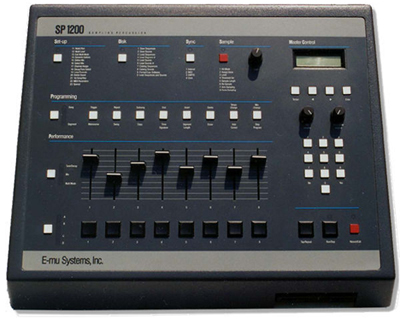
E-mu SP-1200 (1987)

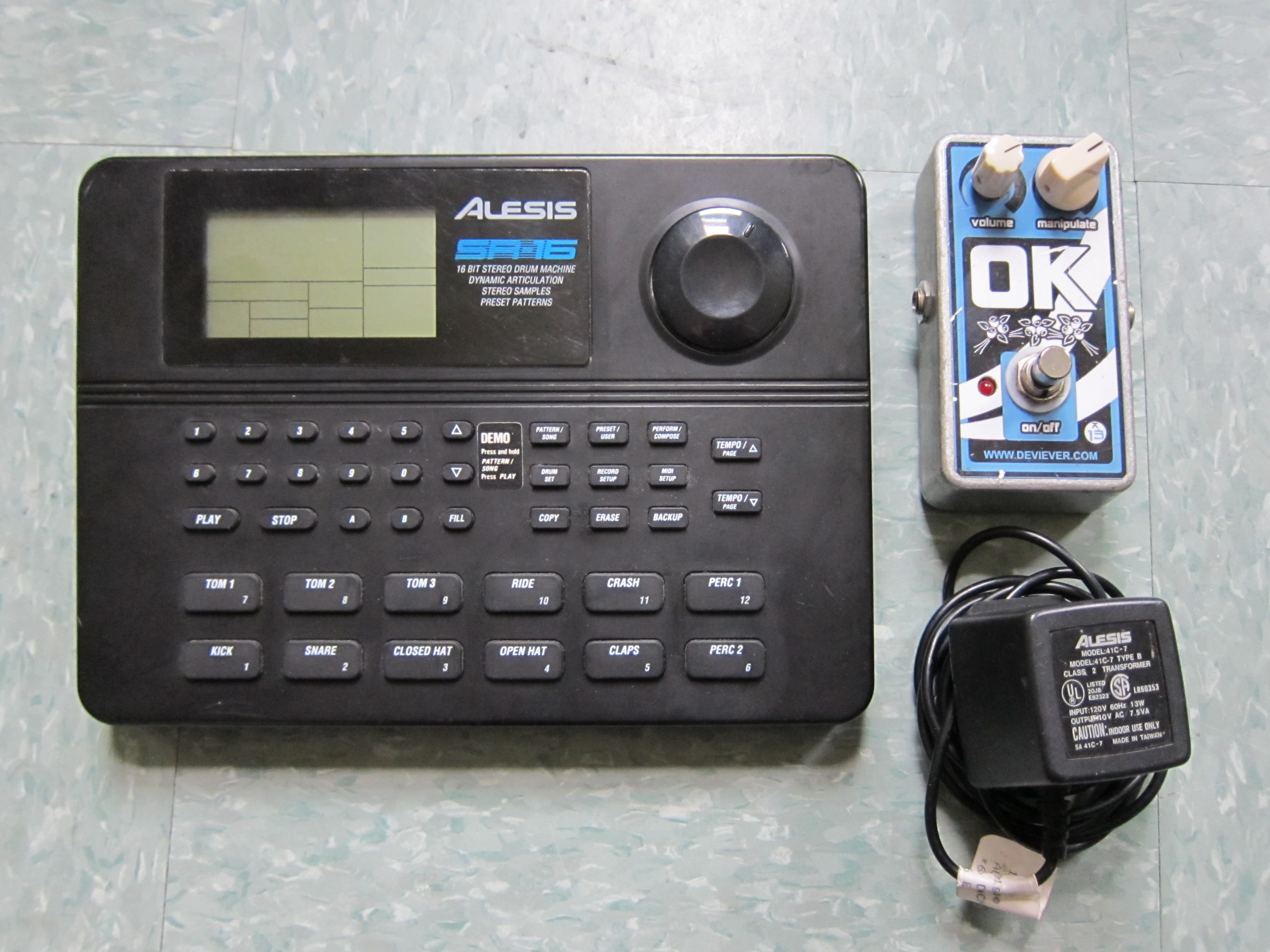
Alesis SR-16 (1991)

By 2000, standalone drum machines had become less common, partly supplanted by general-purpose hardware samplers controlled by sequencers (built-in or external), software-based sequencing and sampling and the use of loops, and music workstations with integrated sequencing and drum sounds. TR-808 and other digitized drum machine sounds can be found in archives on the Internet. However, traditional drum machines are still being made by companies such as Roland Corporation (under the name Boss), Zoom, Korg and Alesis, whose SR-16 drum machine has remained popular since it was introduced in 1991.

There are percussion-specific sound modules that can be triggered by pickups, trigger pads, or through MIDI. These are called drum modules; the Alesis D4 and Roland TD-8 are popular examples. Unless such a sound module also features a sequencer, it is, strictly speaking, not a drum machine.

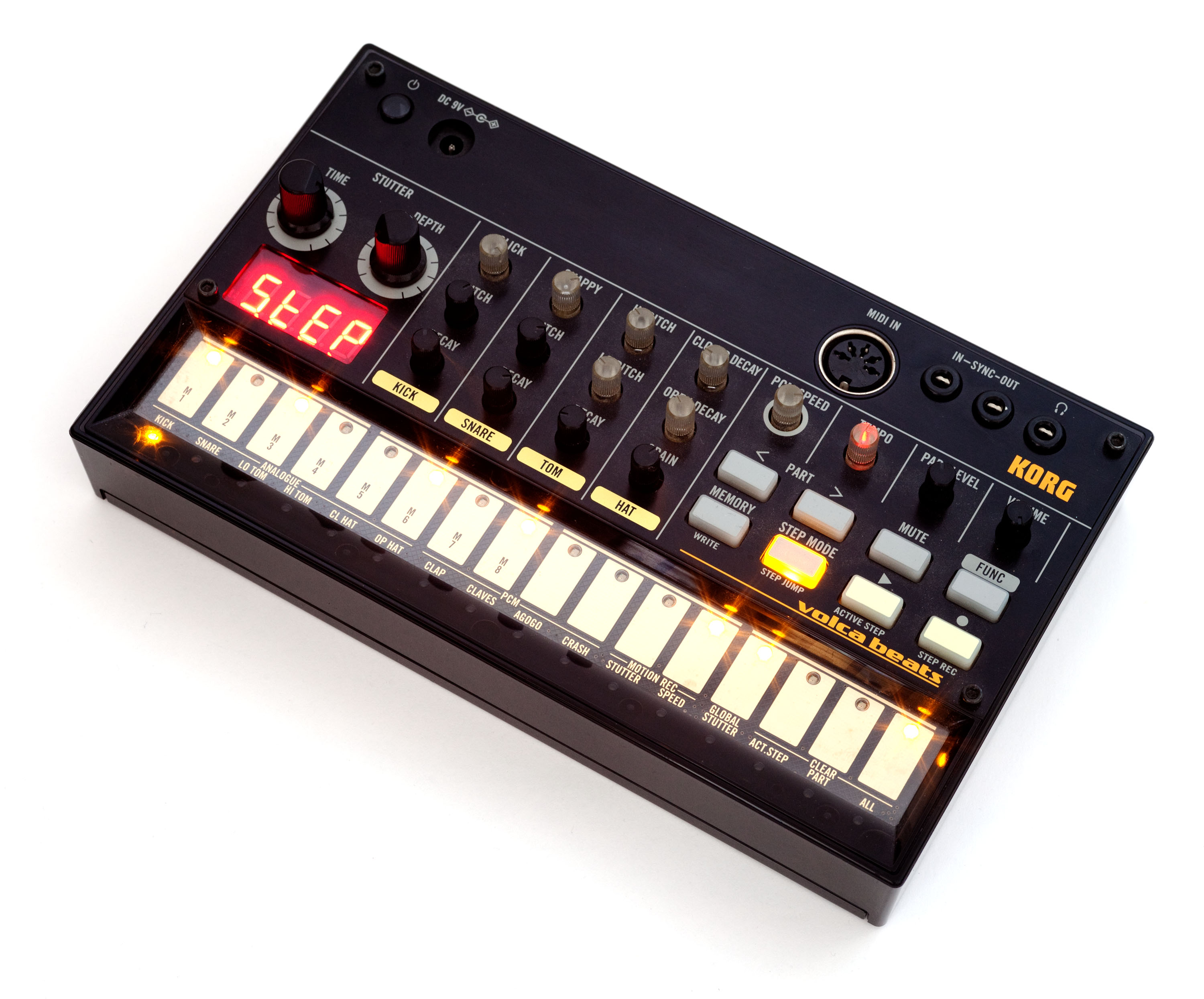
Korg Volca Beats (2013)

In the 2010s a revival of interest in analogue synthesis resulted in a new wave of analogue drum machines, ranging from the budget-priced Korg Volca Beats and Akai Rhythm Wolf to the mid-priced Arturia DrumBrute, and the high-end MFB Tanzbär and Dave Smith Instruments Tempest. Roland's TR-08 and TR-09 Rhythm Composers were digital recreations of the original TR-808 and 909, while Behringer released an analogue clone of the 808 as the Behringer RD-8 Rhythm Designer. Korg released an analog drum machine, the Volca Beats, in 2013.

== Programming ==
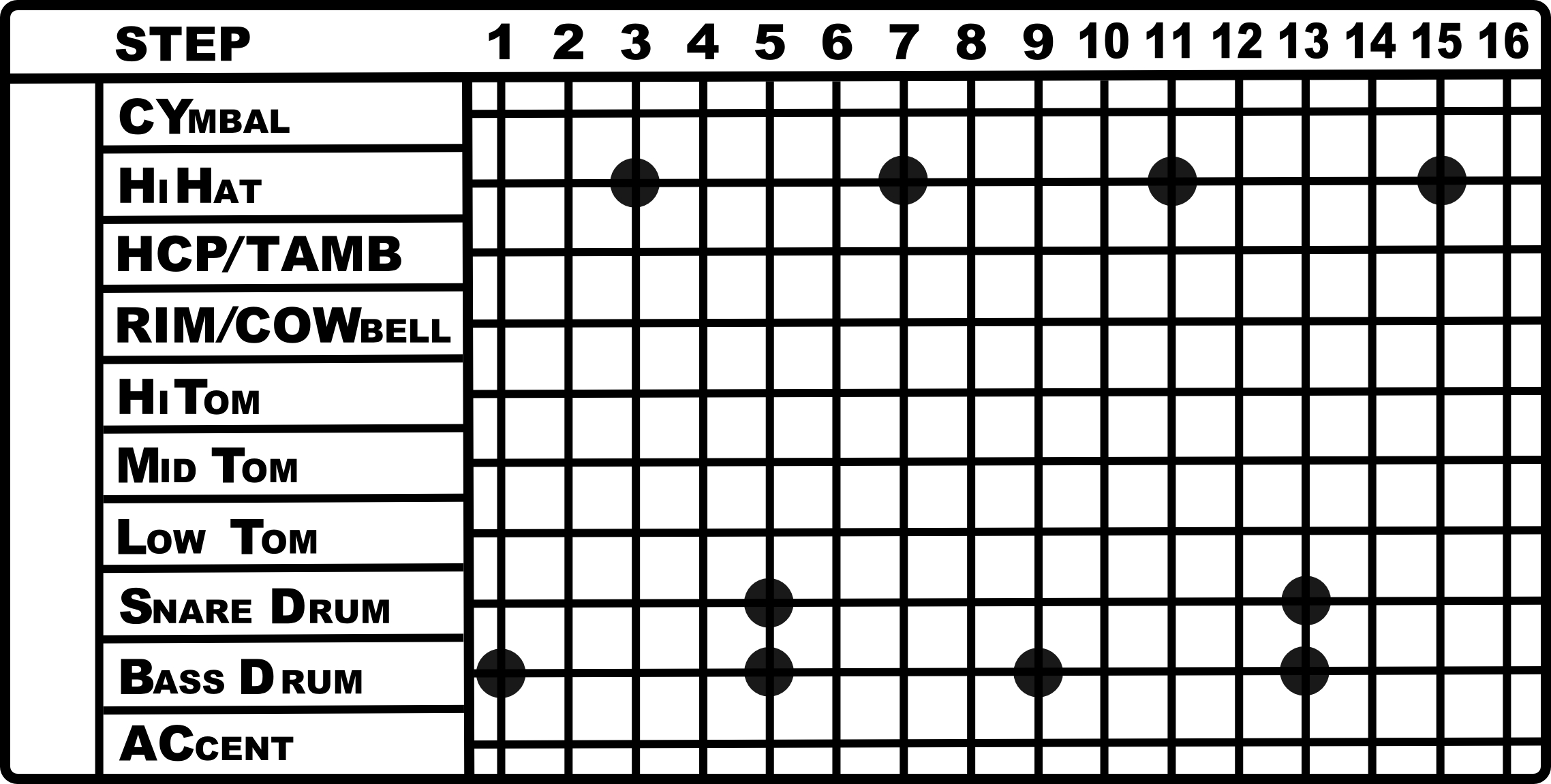
4-on-the-floor on Roland TR-707

Programming of drum machines varies from product to product. On most products, it can be done in real time: the user creates drum patterns by pressing the trigger pads as though a drum kit were being played; or using step-sequencing: the pattern is built up over time by adding individual sounds at certain points by placing them, as with the TR-808 and TR-909, along a 16-step bar. For example, a generic 4-on-the-floor dance pattern could be made by placing a closed high hat on the 3rd, 7th, 11th, and 15th steps, then a kick drum on the 1st, 5th, 9th, and 13th steps, and a clap or snare on the 5th and 13th. This pattern could be varied in a multitude of ways to obtain fills, breakdowns and other elements that the programmer sees fit, which in turn could be sequenced with song-sequence—essentially the drum machine plays back the programmed patterns from memory in an order the programmer has chosen. The machine will quantize entries that are slightly off-beat in order to make them exactly in time.

If the drum machine has MIDI connectivity, then one could program the drum machine with a computer or another MIDI device.

== Comparison with live drumming ==
While drum machines have been used much in popular music since the 1980s, "...scientific studies show there are certain aspects of human-created rhythm that machines cannot replicate, or can only replicate poorly" such as the "feel" of human drumming and the ability of a human drummer to respond to changes in a song as it is being played live onstage. Human drummers also have the ability to make slight variations in their playing, such as playing "ahead of the beat" or "behind the beat" for sections of a song, in contrast to a drum machine that plays a pre-programmed rhythm. Additionally, human drummers can play a "tremendously wide variety of rhythmic variations" that drum machines cannot reproduce.

=== Labor costs ===
Increasingly, drum machines and drum programming are used by major record labels to undercut the costly expense of studio drummers.

== See also ==
- Electronic drum
- Groovebox (generic groove machines)
- Music sequencer
