= Six-Trak =

Polyphonic analogue synthesizer

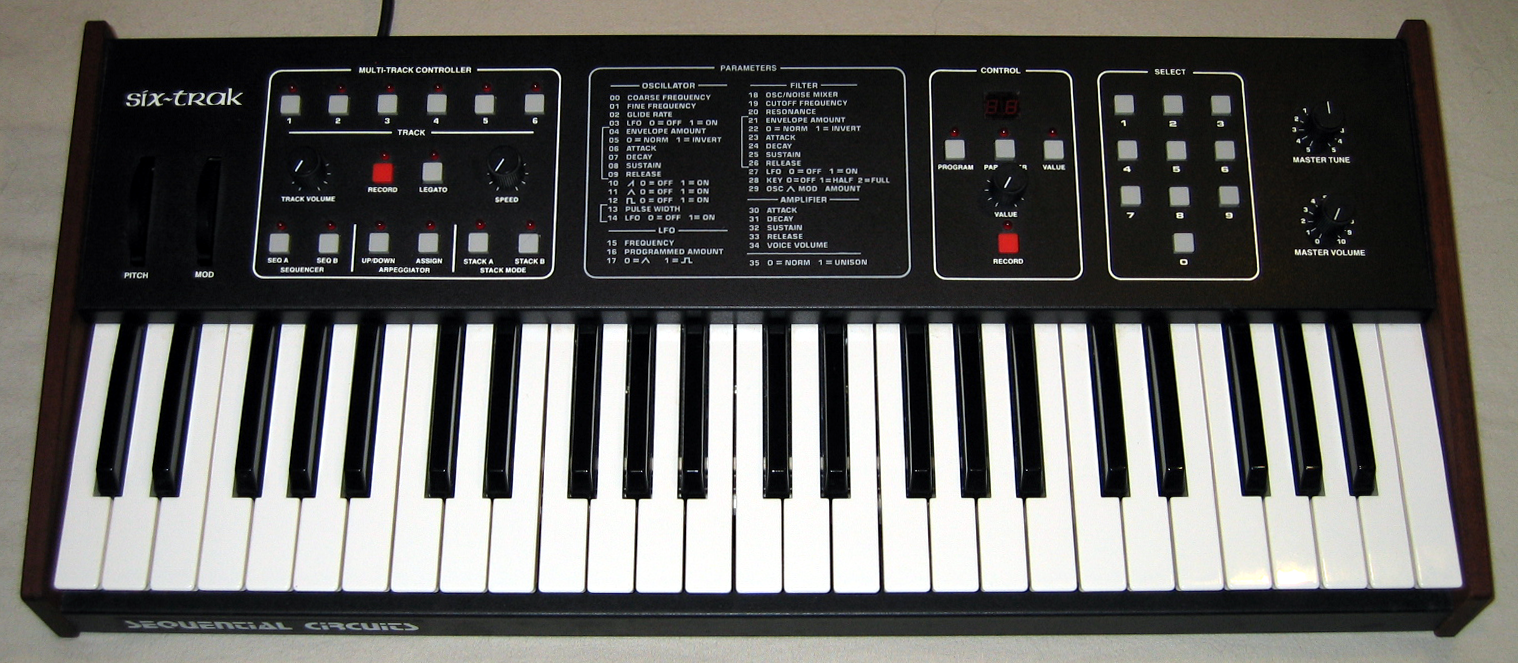
- Sequential Circuits Six-Trak
- Manufacturer: Sequential Circuits
- Dates: 1984

Technical specifications
- Polyphony: 6
- Oscillator: 6 VCO
- Synthesis type: Analog Subtractive

Input/output
- Keyboard: 49-key
- Left-hand control: Pitch, Modulation
- External control: MIDI

The Six-Trak was an analogue synthesizer manufactured by Sequential Circuits in San Jose, California and released in January 1984, notable for being one of the first multi-timbral synthesizers. It is a six-voice polyphonic synthesizer with one oscillator-per-voice equipped with MIDI, arpeggiator and an on-board six-channel digital sequencer which allows individual or grouped track recording. It was designed as an inexpensive and easily portable 'scratch-pad' machine for trying out arrangements. The synthesizer has both a polyphonic and a unison (monophonic) mode.

The Six-Trak is prominently featured and can be heard on the 1998 minimalist space music CD release The Dream Garden, by musician/composer Dane Rochelle. More recently it has been used by composer Christopher de Groot for the 2012 soundtrack to Australian feature film "Sororal".

The synthesizer used CEM3394, a complete monophonic analog synth chip manufactured by Curtis Electromusic Specialties, which was used in other synthesizers made by Sequential Circuits such as the Multi-Trak, Max, Pro-8 and Split-8. The Six-Trak contained 6 chips for 6 voices of different timbre program.

== Notable users ==
- Atrax Morgue
- Benny Blanco
- Gui Boratto
- Chromeo
- Cirrus
- Luis Delgado
- Guerilla Toss
- Helios Creed
- Mitch Margo
- Moka Only
- Oneohtrix Point Never
- Ruki Vverh!
- Solitaire
- Chris Tabron
- Thus Owls
- Überzone
