= Korg OASYS PCI =

Sound card

OASYS PCI
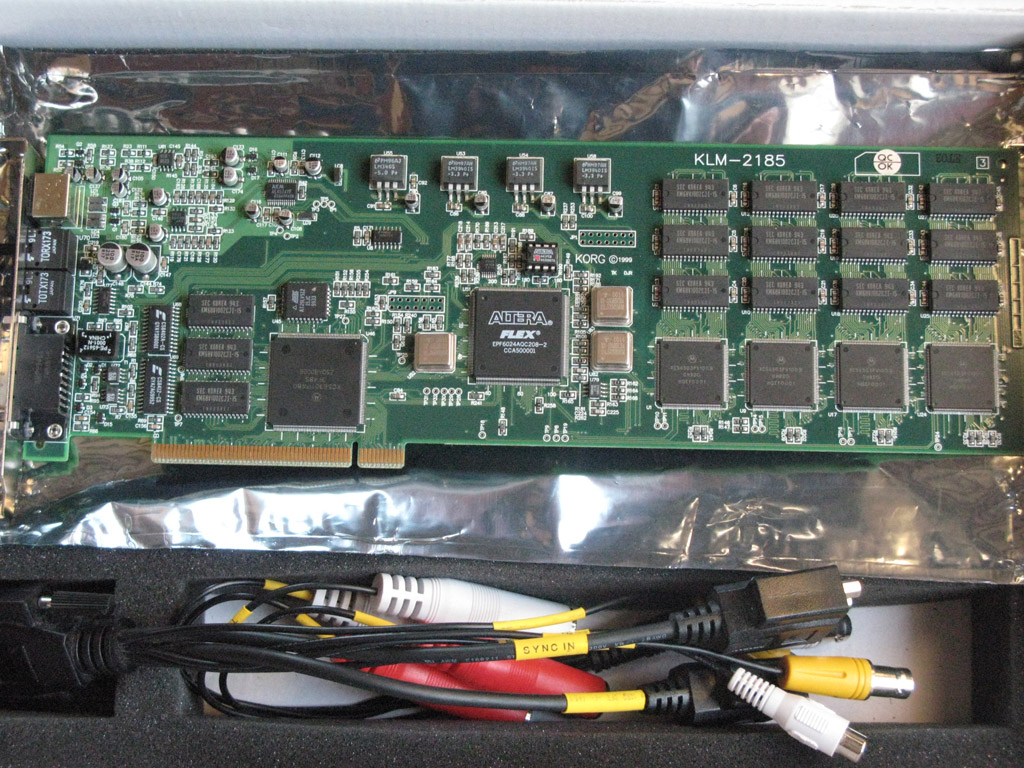
- Korg OASYS PCI
- Manufacturer: Korg
- Dates: 1999-2001
- Price: $2,000

Technical specifications
- Polyphony: 16 (maximum; may vary depending on DSP load)
- Timbrality: 12
- Oscillator: depends on synthesis engine
- Synthesis type: PCM, Physical Modelling, Sampler, Analog Modelling
- Filter: depends on synthesis engine

Input/output
- Keyboard: no
- External control: MIDI

The Korg OASYS PCI is a DSP-based PCI-card for PC and Mac released in 1999. It offers many synthesizer engines from sampling and substractive to FM and physical modelling. Because of its high market price and low polyphony, production was stopped in 2001. About 2000 cards were produced.

== Engines ==
Some of the models were taken from Korg Z1 hardware synthesizer.

=== Virtual Analog ===
- Analog 1 Osc - basic analog synthesizer with one oscillator;
- Analog 2 Osc - same as previous, but with two oscillator. Consume less DSP-power than two copy of Analog 1 Osc;
- Analog Bass-Lead - simple synthesizer dedicated for solo and bass sounds;
- Comb Synth - same as previous, but with comb filter;
- KB-303 - model of Roland TB-303 bass synthesizer;
- Mini Synth - model of Minimoog synthesizer;
- Noise Synth - noise synth for percussion sounds and effects;
- Pro Synth - model of Sequential Circuits Prophet-5 synthesizer;
- Pro Synth Mod - same as previous with two more envelope generators and control elements.

=== Physical modelling ===
- Reed Piano - model of popular e-piano;
- Plucked String - acoustic guitar and other plucked string instrument model;
- Small Plucked String - lite version of previous mode. Consume less DSP power;
- Slap Bass - bass guitar model;
- Small Slap Bass - lite version of previous mode. Consume less DSP power;
- Tonewheel Organ - electric organ model.
- Z1 Organ - model taken from Korg Z1. Sounds pretty the same;
- Tenor Sax - physical model of Saxophone.

=== Drum Synthesizer ===
- Percussion Synth - drum machine similar to Korg Electribe R.
- Percussion Synth 2 - same as previous with one more envelope generators;
- Beat Box - 3-track drum machine with 16-step sequencer and two Percussion Synth 2.

=== Virtual Phase Modulation (Frequency modulation) ===
- VPM 2 OP - 2-op FM synth with one ADSR envelope;
- VPM 4 OP - 4-op FM synth;
- VPM 4 OP Select - 4-op FM synth with 8 algorithms of operators connection. Specification close to Yamaha TX81Z and FB-01.

=== Effects ===
Card comes with basic effects package based on 17 categories. Many of them taken from Korg Trinity workstation synthesizer.

== Extensions ==
Korg released Synth Kit software for Mac OS 9 for extensions developing. Some of addition plugins were released to expand card capabilities:

- Harm Visser (acoustic modelling instruments)
- Dan Philips (effects and tools)
- Orwell Digital (VA and percussion synthesizer)
- Zarg Music (Orion synthesizer)

== Compatibility ==
Due to relatively fast market failure, no drivers were released for modern operating systems. Most users used dedicated computers running Windows 98 or ME.

== Successor ==
The Korg OASYS workstation synthesizer released in early 2005.

== See also ==
- Creamware
- Korg OASYS
- Korg Prophecy
- Korg Trinity
- Korg Triton
- Korg Z1

== Bibliography ==
- Trask, Simon (April 2000). "Korg OASYS PCI - Synthesis, Effects & Audio Card". Sound On Sound. Archived from the original on 8 June 2015. "Korg's longstanding OASYS synthesis project has finally come to commercial fruition. The original plan, to produce a traditional stand-alone synthesizer, has given way to a computer-based synthesis and mixing environment running on a multi-DSP PCI card. Simon Trask takes refuge with the OASYS PCI..." (see also a column on this article: "Native Vs DSP: Dan Phillips (Korg R&D) On Processing Power")
