= Korg Wavestation =

Synthesizer

Wavestation
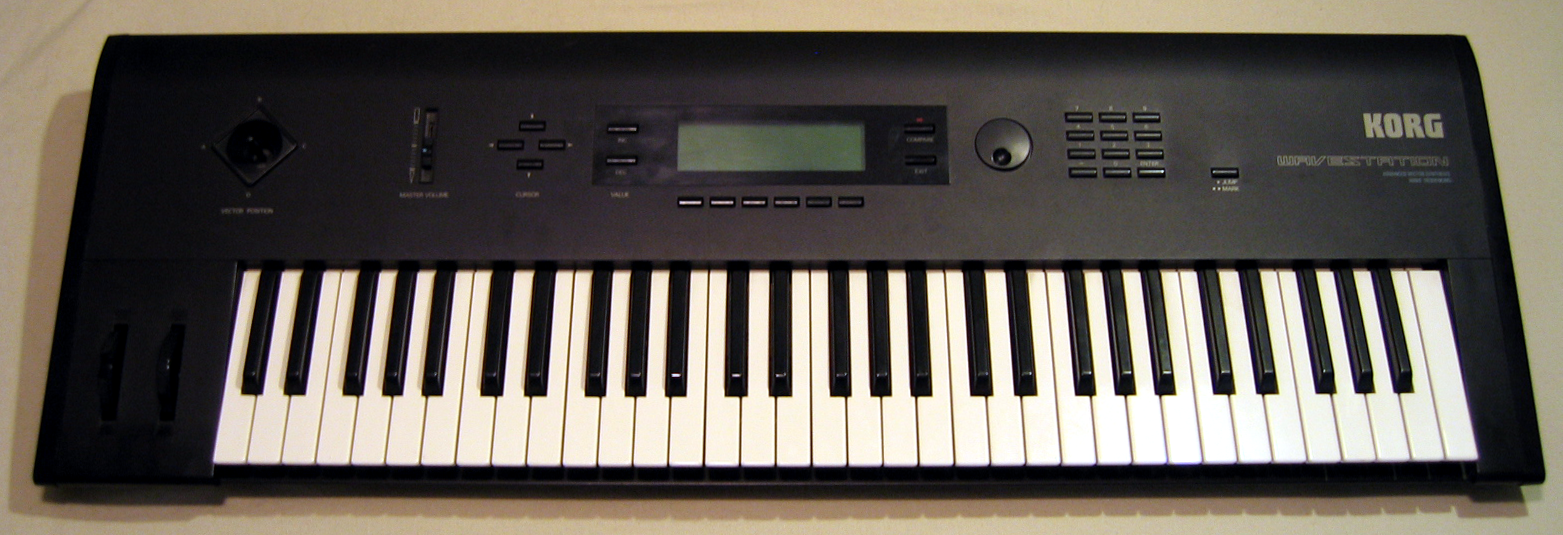
- Korg Wavestation
- Manufacturer: Korg
- Dates: 1990–1994
- Price: $2195 £1575

Technical specifications
- Polyphony: 32
- Timbrality: 8 patches (Wavestation, EX and A/D) and 16 (SR)
- Oscillator: 4 digital oscillators with 396 waves each
- LFO: 2 x 32 – Triangle, Square, Sawtooth, Ramp
- Synthesis type: Digital vector synthesis with Wave Sequencing
- Filter: 32 non-resonant low-pass
- Attenuator: 32 ADSR envelope generators
- Aftertouch expression: Yes – Channel (mono) — Wavestation A/D capable of receiving polyphonic aftertouch
- Velocity expression: Yes
- Storage memory: see memory allocation chart
- Effects: 2×47 or 55

Input/output
- Keyboard: 61-keys
- Left-hand control: Pitch and Modulation Wheels, Joystick
- External control: MIDI

The Korg Wavestation is a vector synthesis synthesizer first produced in the early 1990s and later re-released as a software synthesizer in 2004. Its primary innovation was Wave Sequencing, a method of multi-timbral sound generation in which different PCM waveform data are played successively, resulting in continuously evolving sounds. The Wavestation's "Advanced Vector Synthesis" sound architecture resembled early vector synths such as the Sequential Circuits Prophet VS.

Designed as a "pure" synthesizer rather than a music workstation, it lacked an on-board song sequencer, yet the Wavestation, unlike any synthesizer prior to its release, was capable of generating complex, lush timbres and rhythmic sequences that sounded like a complete soundtrack by pressing only one key. Keyboard Magazine readers gave the Wavestation its "Hardware Innovation of the Year" award, and in 1995 Keyboard listed it as one of the "20 Instruments that Shook the World."

The Wavestation lineup consisted of four models: the Wavestation and Wavestation EX keyboards, and the Wavestation A/D and Wavestation SR rackmount sound modules.

In 2020, Korg released a new hardware 3-octaves-full-of-knobs keyboard version called Korg Wavestate, which integrate a much more powerful version of the original Wavestation, called "wave sequencing V2".

== Design concept ==
The two primary synthesis concepts designed into the Wavestation were Wave Sequencing and vector synthesis, the latter Korg dubbed "Advanced Vector Synthesis". Although the Korg Wavestation was the first keyboard that used Wave Sequencing, its roots can be traced back to the preceding variations of wavetable-lookup synthesis, including the multiple-wavetable synthesizers realized as PPG Wave that was produced by Palm Products GmbH in the early 80s, and the vector synthesis realized as Prophet VS by Sequential Circuits, Inc. in 1986 and Kawai K1 in 1988.

Wave Sequencing improved the vector synthesis on Prophet VS, by incorporating the ability to crossfade up to 255 waveforms, rather than only four. Moreover, a wave sequence can be programmed to "jump" to any PCM wave in ROM memory, whereas similar synths were designed to move sequentially through the wavetable. By combining wave sequencing with vector synthesis—the process of mixing and morphing between multiple waveforms of audio samples—the Wavestation differed from other sample-based synthesizers of the digital era.

=== Wave sequencing ===
Wave sequencing concept: Four-step wave sequence with crossfades.

A wave sequence is a programmed list of PCM waves playing in succession. Each step in the wave sequence can have a different duration, pitch, fine tuning, level and crossfade amount. Additionally, wave sequences can be looped (forward or forward/backward directions) to play indefinitely or for a finite duration; they may also be synchronized to the Wavestation's internal clock (at a user-adjustable tempo) or to MIDI clock signals from a sequencer. The result is a continuously changing sound, producing either a smooth blend of crossfaded waves, or semi-arpeggiated and rhythmic sequences, or a combination of both. In a Patch, different wave sequences can be assigned to each of the four oscillators, thus the Wavestation is capable of generating four distinct wave sequences playing simultaneously during a single note. In Performance mode, up to thirty-two discrete wave sequences can be played at the same time by layering eight 4-voice patches, although the actual number of playable wave sequences may be less because an additional oscillator is required to execute a crossfade.

=== Vector synthesis ===
Vector synthesis concept: Controlling the mix of four sound waves by defining a point on a vector plane using a joystick.

Simply, vector synthesis is dynamic timbre control over 2 or more voices (oscillators). On the Wavestation, vector synthesis can be applied on any two or four-oscillator patch. The volume blend (or mix ratio) between oscillators is varied over time via a dedicated mix envelope, in real-time via the front panel's vector joystick, or via other controllers such as LFOs, aftertouch, and MIDI.

The mix envelope for a two-oscillator patch structure is arranged on a horizontal line or axis, and is interpreted as one-dimensional vector synthesis. Two dimensional vector synthesis requires a four-oscillator structure, with oscillators A & C arranged on the horizontal X axis and oscillators B & D on the vertical Y axis. A patch's mix envelope can be looped for a finite or indefinite amount of time as well as modulated by controllers. Moving the joystick whilst playing overrides the pre-programmed mix envelope, giving the user dynamic control over the timbre of the sound.

== Features and specifications ==
The internal synthesis architecture was based on the "AI Synthesis" system used in Korg's previous M and T-series synthesizers. The Wavestation offered 32-voice polyphony, up to four digital oscillators per patch, with a non-resonant low-pass filter and an amplifier block for each oscillator. Modulators, LFOs and envelope generators were offered as control sources for those blocks. The effects section contained two DSP blocks capable of a wide range of processing algorithms, such as reverb, delay, chorus, flanger, phaser, etc.

=== Memory allocation ===
Similar in structure to the Ensoniq VFX and Korg's M1, the Wavestation's top level of sound control is the Performance, which organizes up to eight Patches (parts) and two independent effect processors. A Performance also controls keyboard zoning, MIDI channel assignment, velocity switching, and other parameters. Each Bank contains 50 Performances.

Korg Wavestation Internal Memory (excluding Card option)
	WS	WS EX	WS A/D	WS SR	Software
Performances	150		200	550	850
Patches	105		140	385	595
Wave Sequences	96		128	352	544
Wave Sequence; Steps	1500		2000	5500	8500
Multisets	16			32	0*
	* Additional instances of software can be run simultaneously				

Producing the synthesizer voices are Patches, the middle tier in the programming hierarchy. A patch consists of 1, 2, or 4 digital oscillators (A, B, C, and D). Tone generation is achieved by assigning any of the 20-bit PCM samples and single-cycle waveforms or a wave sequence to an oscillator. Each oscillator has its own digital filter, amplifier, amp envelope, general purpose envelope, two LFOs, and numerous modulation routings. The mix envelope for vector synthesis is also found at the Patch level. There are 35 Patches per Bank.

Wave Sequences are at the bottom tier of the Wavestation's programming structure. The Wavestation treats these as if they are discrete PCM waveforms when assigning them to oscillators in a Patch, although a wave sequence itself is created from a list of PCM waveforms in ROM or Card memory. The maximum number of steps per wave sequence is 255, and the maximum number of steps allocated per Bank is 500. It is therefore possible to exhaust the step memory in a Bank with two very long wave sequences. 32 wave sequences are available per Bank.

The Wavestation's Multimode organizes up to 16 Performances (one per MIDI channel) and two effects into a Multiset, which allows for multi-timbral reception from a MIDI sequencer or master keyboard controller. Multisets have two major drawbacks. First, a single, complex Performance may use up all of the polyphony in the Wavestation with only one or two keys depressed, so multiple complex Performances would result in extreme voice-stealing. The other drawback is that effects are vital to the overall sound of the Wavestation, but a Multiset cannot have 32 effects. So it ignores the original effects in Performances and assigns two new effects for use with all 16 Performances. Since a Performance can also transmit and receive multi-timbrally on eight parts, Multisets are generally superfluous.

=== Models ===
Korg Wavestation model comparison
	WS	WS EX	WS A/D	WS SR	Software
Latest OS	1.28*	3.19	1.25	1.15	1.6
PCM ROM	2MB	4MB			
# of Samples	365	484			700+
# of Effects	47	55			
RAM Banks	2		3		
ROM Banks	1			8	14
PCM Card Type	M1-style			O1/W-style	—N/a
Display	64×240 Graphic			16×2 Text	—N/a
Vector Joystick	Yes			No	Yes
	*Upgradeable to 3.19 without additional 2MB EX-PCM data				

- Wavestation (1990) – The first Wavestation keyboard to reach the market, it premiered the vector synthesis and wave sequencing concepts under the Korg brand. Its 2MB soundset was synth-oriented which lacked acoustic piano sounds and drums, relying instead on sampled waveforms from classic synthesizers of the 80s, most of the Prophet VS waveforms, and numerous attack transients and instrument samples from Korg's sample library. It could take Korg's proprietary PCM and RAM type expansion cards. The user interface comprised a 64×240 backlit, graphical LCD with soft-key menu system (the buttons under the display), a data entry dial similar to that used on Roland's Alpha-Juno keyboards, a numeric keypad and other function buttons. A 61-key semi-weighted keyboard, pitch and modulation wheels, and a vector joystick comprised the player controls. The Wavestation received much critical acclaim, including Keyboard Magazine's "Hardware Innovation of the Year."
- Wavestation EX (1991) – Identical in form to the original Wavestation keyboard, Korg created the EX in response to player feedback and criticism. The EX doubled the ROM to 4MB by adding 119 new samples (most notably piano, drums, and the remaining Prophet VS waves), and eight new digital effects. Bugs in the operating system were also fixed (though several still remained). Those who had purchased an original Wavestation could buy the EXK-WS upgrade kit to convert their keyboards to the EX version. The iconic Macintosh start-up sound was generated on a Wavestation EX by Apple sound designer Jim Reekes.
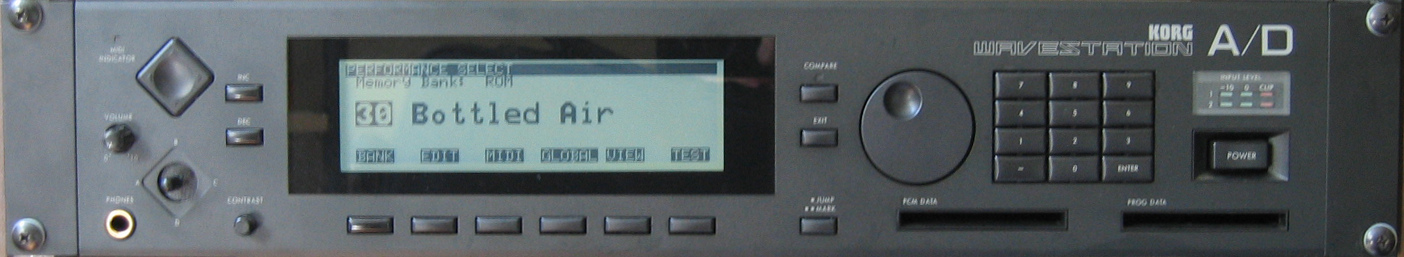
- Wavestation A/D
  Wavestation A/D (1991) – It was the first rackmount version of the Wavestation technology. Korg replaced the large joystick with a smaller version, the same display from the keyboard versions was retained, and an additional RAM bank added. A unique feature was its analog inputs, capable of accepting guitar, mic and line-level signal; it allowed the effect processors to process those signals in realtime (particularly useful with the vocoders in the new EX effects). All of the keyboard's front panel buttons also survived the transition, making the programming process identical to the original Wavestation. The A/D inputs also were an option when creating wave sequences, incorporating the input signal into the synthesis engine in realtime.
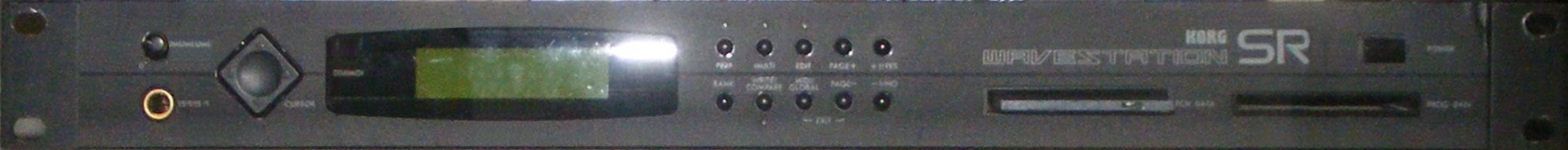
- Wavestation SR
  Wavestation SR (1992) – The last hardware implementation of the Wavestation was a 1-unit rackmount model. It lacked the A/D inputs of its predecessor, the screen was downsized to a character-based 16×2 LCD, and most buttons, function keys, and the joystick disappeared. Marketed as a preset module, it featured eight ROM preset banks with Patches and Performances previously sold on expansion cards from Korg and Sound Source Unlimited, Inc. Without an external MIDI sound editor, programming was a very difficult task due to the small display, although all parameters can be edited from the panel.
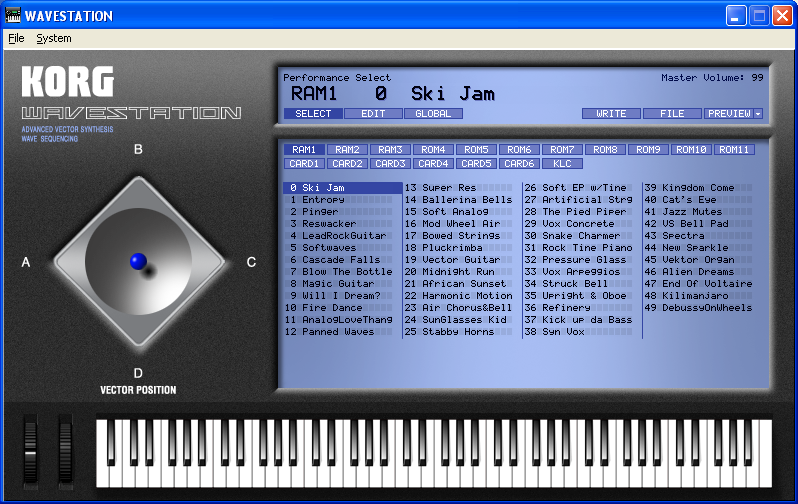
- KLC Wavestation
  Software Wavestation (2004) – Fourteen years after the first Wavestation appeared, Korg released a software-based emulation of the synthesizer which also included all the instrument patches from Korg's line of expansion ROM cards. In late 2006 Korg released version 1.6 of the software Wavestation which added a resonant filter. Also, "50 new Performances, 35 new Patches, and 32 new Wave Sequences are added to take advantage of this new resonant filter."
- iWavestation (2016) – This is a native program for the iOS platform (iPhone and iPad) which recreates the physical synthesizer. It can be downloaded from Apple's AppStore. It includes all the instrument patches from Korg's expansion ROM cards as in-app purchases. Current version (as of May 2021) is 1.1.1.

== Design history ==
The Wavestation was designed by a team which included Dave Smith, who designed the Prophet-5 and, along with Roland, helped to invent the MIDI protocol in the early 1980s. His synthesizer company, Sequential Circuits, was purchased by Yamaha in 1988. The division was renamed DSD (intended by Yamaha to stand for Dave Smith Designs). The team, ex-SCI engineers Dave Smith, John Bowen, Scott Peterson, and Stanley Jungleib, then went on to Korg in May 1989 and designed the Wavestation, refining many Prophet VS concepts.

The Wavestation A/D was the brainchild of Joe Bryan, then Senior Design Engineer at Korg R&D. A guitar player, he wanted "something that worked with a simple MIDI guitar that would merge the guitar, synth and effects, and could be controlled from one or two buttons on the guitar." The idea was of little interest to his colleagues at first. Nevertheless, he found a prototype of a Sequential Circuits Prophet 2000 sampler and literally hacksawed the analog-to-digital converter circuitry from it, soldered that and a digital interface to the Wavestation's ROM bus to create the first prototype of the Wavestation A/D. The prototype convinced Bryan's colleagues of his idea.

== Musical impact ==
The Wavestation is known as one of the best synth pad generators, and has been used by many musicians to explore uncommon synthesis textures. A few notable mainstream artists that used Wavestations in the early 1990s were Joe Zawinul, Jan Hammer, Phil Collins, Michael Cretu (used KORG WAVESTATION on the first five albums of his famous project "Enigma (German band)" (the factory preset "Deep Atmosphere" was most often used), Gary Numan, Keith Emerson, and Tony Banks of Genesis, Depeche Mode, Steve Hillier of Dubstar, Michael Jackson, Ed Wynne of Ozric Tentacles, Ulf Langheinrich and Alan Clark and Guy Fletcher of Dire Straits. Soundtrack composer Mark Snow also used a Wavestation SR when scoring episodes of the X-Files.

The sound of the Wavestation is familiar to users of the Apple Macintosh, since the startup chime that has featured on every Mac from the Quadra 700 to the Quadra 800 was created by Jim Reekes on a Korg Wavestation. Reekes said, "The startup sound was done in my home studio on a Korg Wavestation. It's a C Major chord, played with both hands stretched out as wide as possible (with 3rd at the top, if I recall)." The sound in question is a slightly modified "Sandman" factory preset.

== Legacy ==
The Wavestation remains one of the most evocative, unusual, creatively-designed synths ever...

— Craig Anderton, Keyboard Magazine

The OASYS (2005) and Korg Kronos (2011) workstations have full-blown wave sequencing and vector synthesis implementation (complete with joystick), along with virtual analog, sample-based synthesis, and 16 MIDI + 16 digital audio tracks.

== Software emulations ==
Korg now produces a collection of software-based versions of its classic synthesizers, called the Korg Legacy Collection. With the Wavestation it incorporates the entire library of the original Wavestation's samples, wave sequences and presets making the vector synthesis concept more affordable and known to a wider audience. A native version for iOS, named iWavestation, has also been released.
