= Vector synthesis =

Type of audio synthesis

Vector Synthesis is a type of audio synthesis introduced by Sequential Circuits in the Prophet VS synthesizer during 1986. The concept was subsequently used by Yamaha in the SY22/TG33 and similar instruments and by Korg in the Wavestation.

Controlling the mix of four sound waves by defining a point on a vector plane using a joystick

Vector synthesis provides movement in a sound by providing dynamic cross-fading between (usually) four sound sources. The four sound sources are conceptually arranged as the extreme points of X and Y axes, and typically labelled A, B, C and D. A given mix of the four sound sources can be represented by a single point in this 'vector plane'. Movement of the point provides sonic interest and is the power of this technique. Mixing is frequently done using a joystick, although the point can be controlled using envelope generators or LFOs.

== Vector synthesis implementations ==
There have been a number of different implementations of vector synthesis. These differ in what they use for the four sound sources, and what processing is done to the sound after the vector synthesis stage. The actual vector synthesis concept is identical.

=== Prophet VS vector synthesis ===
The Prophet VS used four digital wavetable oscillators as its four sound sources. The limitations, particularly the digital aliasing, of this design, coupled with its use of Curtis analogue filter ICs to process the mixed sound, gave the Prophet VS its distinctive sound.

=== Yamaha SY series ===
The Yamaha SY22 added to the Prophet's implementation of vector synthesis by providing two types of sound source. Each axis of the vector had both an FM sound source and a sample-playback source. Although it lacked any filtering, it added digital effects for processing the results of the vector synthesis.

=== Korg Wavestation ===
The Korg Wavestation went further still, allowing each of the four sound sources to produce not just a static tone, but a complex wave sequence, by playing back or cross-fading one wave after another.

=== Korg OASYS ===
The Korg OASYS workstation is one of the first synthesizers for over a decade to feature vector synthesis. It also features an updated form of wave sequencing, like the Wavestation. The Korg Kronos also features this synthesis.

=== Arturia Origin ===
The Prophet VS, a hybrid virtual instrument version of the original Prophet VS, features vector synthesis, as well as Arturia's Origin hardware synthesizer, which uses an automated mixer, the 2D Envelope.

== See also ==
- "Introduction to Vector Synthesis" - Stanley Jungleib, Electronic Musician November 1986 p.53, p.54
