= Prophet VS =

Polyphonic digital synthesizer

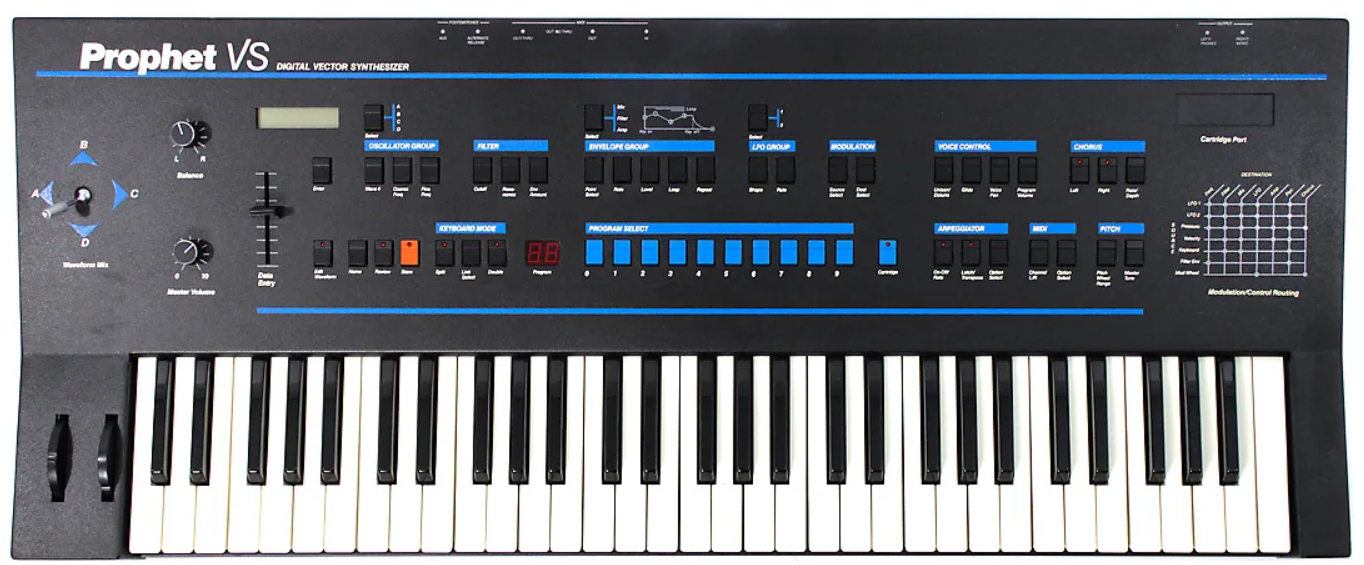
- Sequential Circuits Prophet VS
- Manufacturer: Sequential Circuits
- Dates: 1986-87

Technical specifications
- Polyphony: 8
- Timbrality: 2-part
- Oscillator: 12-bit digital 4 per voice 96 preset & 32 user waveforms
- LFO: 2
- Synthesis type: Vector; Sample & Synthesis (S&S)
- Filter: Analog resonant low-pass
- Attenuator: 5-stage loopable envelope generator
- Aftertouch expression: Yes
- Velocity expression: Yes
- Storage memory: Internal: 100 patches + 32 user waves Cartridge: 100 patches + 32 user waves
- Effects: Stereo Chorus; Voice Panning

Input/output
- Keyboard: 61-key 0 (rack version)
- Left-hand control: Pitch, Modulation
- External control: MIDI

The Prophet VS is a hybrid 8-voice synthesizer manufactured by Sequential Circuits and released in 1986. It is notable for being the first synthesizer to use vector synthesis to structure its sound, using a joystick arranged in a "diamond" pattern for oscillator mixing. Its distinctive sound comes from mixing four 12-bit digital single-cycle waves per voice, which are then fed into analog CEM3379/3389 signal processors for filtering and amplification.

== Features and architecture ==
=== Sound generation ===
The VS has 8 voices, each one featuring up to four digital oscillators. Each oscillator is chosen from a table of 0-126 12-bit single cycle waveforms, with the 127th selection being a noise generator.

Waves 32–126 are programmed into the firmware EPROMs and cannot be externally modified. However, waves 0-31 are the user wave space and can be overwritten with custom samples utilizing the MIDI sample dump standard. Another unique characteristic of the VS is that the user waves can be manually edited with the onboard wave editor, mixing up to 4 waves into a single one or adjusting individual harmonics similarly to additive synthesis.

Each voice has a CEM3379/3389 analog signal processor which gives voltage control over the filter, amplifier, and panning. Modulation of panning CV utilizing the modulation matrix can create lush moving stereo patterns.

=== Hardware ===
The VS uses an 8 MHz Motorola 68000 as the main processor, along with two 27256 EPROMs for the operating firmware. Besides the usual 7400 & 4000 series logic chips, there are several unique or hard-to-find parts

- I-625 Voice Chip x4 – Each unit uses these for Waves A-D. 8 digital oscillators plus noise generator. These are unique to the VS.
- 68B01 Keyboard Controller – Scans the mechanical keyboard and calculates velocity values. Also used in the Prophet 2000.
- CEM5510 x4 – 8-channel high-speed sample and hold. Used to fake VCAs for oscillator mixing. These are unique to the VS.
- CEM5530 x2 – 30-channel sample and hold. Used to fake VCAs for voice mixing. This is a common point of failure, and several aftermarket replacements are available. Also used in the Studio 440 and Keytek CTS-2000.
- CEM3365 x2 – Dual DAC multiplier.
- CEM3379 or CEM3389 x8 – Analog VCF, VCA, and voltage-controlled panning.

== Legacy ==
After Sequential was acquired and shut down by Yamaha in 1989, Dave Smith and a handful of the development team moved to Korg, where they worked on developing the Korg Wavestation. Yamaha then expanded upon the VS technology to create the Yamaha SY22 and SY35 in 1990, adding FM synthesis.

In the 2020s, Behringer released two clones of the Prophet VS, a eurorack synth engine called the "Victor" and a miniature version of the complete synth called the "Pro VS Mini".

While modernizing the appearance of the joystick for all following vector based instruments, functionally the "diamond" layout has been followed ever since.

== Notable users ==
- John Carpenter
- Prince
- Trent Reznor
- Rush – The VS Choir is featured prominently on the album Hold Your Fire.
- Whitesnake – The VS Choir is featured in the beginning of Here I Go Again
