= Korg Z1 =

Synthesizer released in 1997

Z1
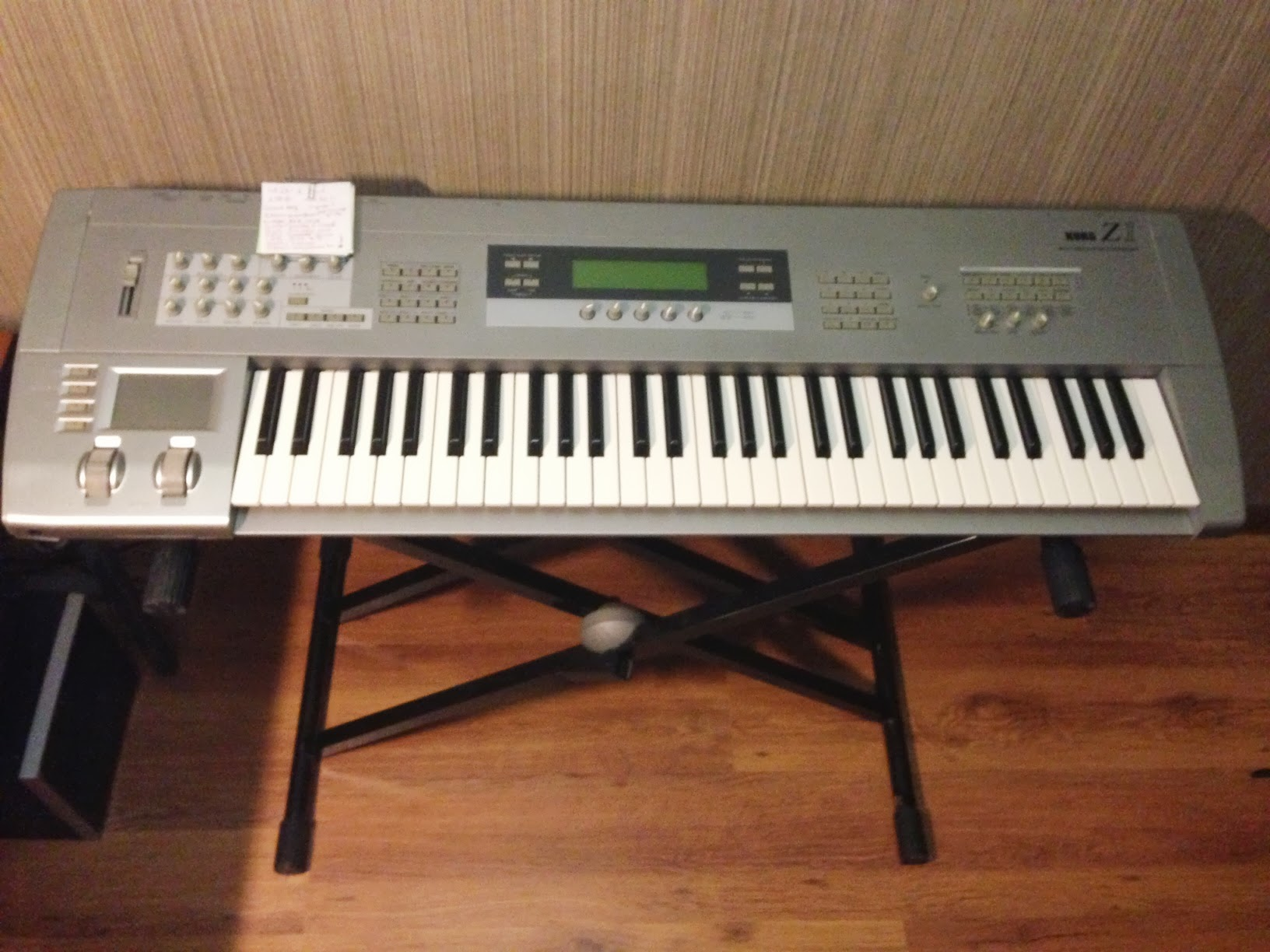
- Korg Z1
- Manufacturer: Korg
- Dates: 1997-1999
- Price: MSRP $2,395

Technical specifications
- Polyphony: 12
- Timbrality: 6
- Oscillator: 2 modelling oscillators 1 sub oscillator 1 noise generator
- LFO: 4
- Synthesis type: Physical modelling Analog modelling Variable phase modulation
- Filter: LPF, HPF, Dual BPF
- Aftertouch expression: Yes
- Velocity expression: Yes
- Effects: 2 FX units with 15 FX each, 3 master FX, master EQ

Input/output
- Keyboard: 61-key
- Left-hand control: 2 assignable wheels, 4 switches, X/Y Ribbon controller
- External control: MIDI

The Korg Z1 is a digital synthesizer released by Korg in 1997. The Z1 built upon the foundation set by the monophonic Prophecy released two years prior by offering 12-note polyphony and featuring expanded oscillator options, a polyphonic arpeggiator and an XY touchpad for enhanced performance interaction. It was the world's first multitimbral physical modelling synthesizer.

== Background ==
In the mid-1990s, two new synthesis technologies emerged: physical modelling and analog modelling. Physical modelling recreated the sounds of acoustic instruments by simulating their physical properties, as demonstrated by the Yamaha VL1 in 1994. Analog modelling mimicked the characteristics of analog circuits, first introduced in the Clavia Nord Lead in the same year.

Korg debuted their Multi-Oscillator Synthesis System (MOSS) in 1995 with the Prophecy monosynth, which offered both physical and analog modelling synthesis. This technology was later expanded into a polyphonic format with the release of the Z1, which featured additional physical models. The synthesis types offered by the Z1 led to the development of the MOSS expansion board, which incorporates Z1 sound engines into Korg's range of workstations, including the Korg Trinity and Triton.

== Sounds and features ==
The Z1 uses the same case as the Korg Trinity and features a 61-note keyboard with velocity sensitivity and aftertouch. It is equipped with a 240x64 pixel LCD, which is smaller than the Trinity's display, and boasts 23 knobs on its top panel. This includes five assignable Performance Editor knobs, similar to those found on the Prophecy. Additionally, the Z1 has a touch-sensitive X-Y pad, featuring many of the capabilities of the Prophecy's Log controller.

The physical modelling engines of the Z1 stem from Korg's OASYS (Open Architecture SYnthesis System). Each voice is generated from two physically modelled oscillators, complemented by a sub-oscillator and a noise generator. The Z1 offers a 12-voice polyphony and supports 6-part multitimbrality, allowing the voices to be distributed across six MIDI channels for multitimbral arrangements.

The Z1 oscillators utilise the MOSS system, which offers 13 different synthesis algorithms employing various synthesis techniques such as physical modelling synthesis, analog modelling synthesis, and Korg's variable phase modulation (VPM) synthesis. Some of the various synthesis algorithms can be combined to create a vast range of sound. The Z1 features the nine models found in the Prophecy, which include the Analog, VPM, Brass, Reed, Plucked String, Comb Filter, Sync, Ring Modulator, and Cross-Modulation models. Additionally, the Z1 introduces four new oscillator models, which are the Resonance, Organ, Electric Piano, and Bowed String models.

The sound from the two MOSS oscillators is then mixed with a sub-oscillator that provides sawtooth, square, triangle, and sine waveforms, and which can be tuned independently of OSC1 and OSC2, and a white noise generator with a dedicated resonant filter. The Z1 offers two multi-mode filters with low-pass, high-pass, band-pass, band-reject, and dual band-pass responses. Following this, the signal enters an amplifier Section with a 5-stage envelope. A unique feedback option enables the output from the amplifier section to be rerouted into the signal chain for distortion effects.

The Z1 is equipped with four extra modulation envelopes and four LFOs, each capable of producing 17 distinct waveforms, including sample and hold. Its effects section is multitimbral, enabling distinct effects and EQ adjustments on separate tracks. This includes 15 insert effects and a master effects section that introduces three additional effects and a 2-band EQ. The Z1 includes an arpeggiator that supports both monophonic and polyphonic patterns and allows for the limitation of arpeggios to designated keyboard zones.

The DSPB-Z1 expansion board, an optional add-on, increases the Z1's voice count from 12 to 18, while the DI-TRI digital interface board equips the Z1 with a 48kHz wordclock input and an ADAT-compatible digital output.

== See also ==
- Korg OASYS
- Korg Prophecy
- Korg Trinity
