= Korg Trinity =

Music workstation

Trinity
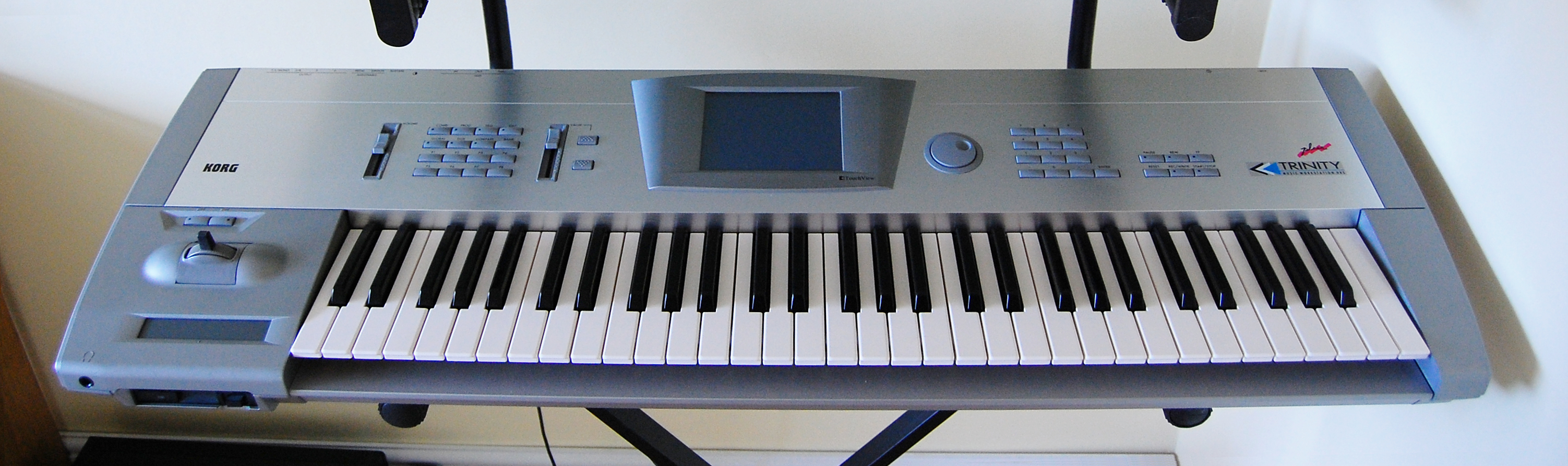
- Manufacturer: Korg
- Dates: 1995–1999
- Price: $3,599/£2,395/¥270,000 MSRP (Trinity) $3,999/£2,700/¥300,000 MSRP (Trinity Plus)

Technical specifications
- Polyphony: 32 oscillators / max 32 voices
- Timbrality: 16-part
- Oscillator: 32 total, 2 max/Program
- Synthesis type: PCM-based subtractive (optional VA/FM/physical modelling)
- Filter: 2 multimode filters per oscillator
- Aftertouch expression: yes, channel
- Velocity expression: yes
- Storage memory: 256 Combinations; 256 Programs (64 MOSS synth Bank-S/-M, if installed) (doubled to 512/512/[128] with PBS-TRI option)
- Effects: Insert: 8 total "Size" processing blocks accessing 100 algorithms of 1/2/4 blocks each, Master-Chorus/Delay: 8 algorithms, Master-Reverb: 6 algorithms

Input/output
- Keyboard: 61, 76 or 88 keys with velocity and aftertouch
- External control: 4x audio-output, headphones, MIDI in/out/thru, 3x pedal

The Korg Trinity is a synthesizer and music workstation released by Korg in 1995. It was Korg's first modern workstation and marked a significant evolution from its predecessors by offering features such as built-in digital audio recording, 32-note polyphony, an extensive internal sound library, assignable effects, and a large touchscreen for advanced control and editing functions, a feature not previously seen on any musical instrument. It also offered modular expansion for not only sounds, but also studio-grade features such as ADAT, various sound engine processors, audio recording capability, and more.

The Trinity was considered one of the most comprehensive music workstations, in terms of features, at the time. After the discontinuation of the M1, the Trinity became the next Korg flagship synthesizer. In 1998, Trinity V3 models were introduced, incorporating sound engines from the Korg Z1.

== Background ==
The Trinity and the Korg Prophecy were both introduced on the same day, drawing significantly from the technology developed for KORG's OASYS "Open Architecture Synthesis System" synthesizer. While the OASYS was a prototype that was showcased but not released commercially, it was built on an open DSP system concept capable of loading diverse models for various synthesis types and physical modelling sound generators, utilizing a multi-DSP architecture. The Trinity boasted the ACCESS sound generator, which included 48 MB of PCM waveforms and introduced resonant filters into Korg's workstation lineup for the first time.

The Trinity's design, from its aesthetic to its operational framework, draws heavily from the Korg 'T' and '01' series, incorporating elements such as Programs, Combis, and sequencing capabilities, as well as familiar global configurations and disk operations.

== Sounds and features ==
The Trinity utilizes a large, touch-sensitive screen for editing, allowing users to select parameter names or icons and modify values using the data entry fader, up/down buttons, the 10-key keypad, or the spinwheel. Resting a finger on the screen displays an enlarged control, which can be adjusted by dragging the finger up, down, or around the screen.

It utilizes 16-bit, 48kHz PCM samples stored in 24MB of ROM, effectively doubled to 48Mb through 2:1 data compression. The sound library comprises over 1,000 individual samples, including 374 multisamples and an extensive drum library of 258 PCM sounds. Users can create up to 12 customizable drum kits, with the ability to apply up to four effects per kit. Additionally, each drum sound can be independently panned and sent to the filter.

Trinity's effects system was revolutionary at the time for the number of simultaneous effects (potentially truly multitimbral, plus overall effects), the ability of the user to assign those simultaneous effects with a great degree of freedom, the large number, variety, programmability of effects algorithms, and realtime effects control.

The effects system included eight-total user-assigned "Insert Effect" "Size" processing blocks, plus two distinct "Master Effect" send/return scheme processors. The Insert effect blocks are assigned by the user in series-chains of "Size 1" (single-block, mono-in/mono-out, 29 algorithms), and/or "Size 2" (double-block, usually stereo-in/stereo-out, 52 algorithms, including reverbs), and/or "Size 4" (quadruple-block, complex, 19 algorithms) effects, with a Program limit totaling Size four or fewer blocks and three or fewer algorithms in series, or a Drum Kit limit of total Size four or fewer blocks and four or fewer algorithms in series or parallel, or multitimbral Combination or Sequencer Modes in Timbre Groups each utilizing all eight or fewer Size blocks divided into one or more series-chains with three or fewer algorithms per series for Programs and/or series-chains or parallel with four or fewer algorithms for Drum Kits (some further Size 4 algorithm placement restrictions apply).

The "Master-Modulation" (six algorithms) and "Master-Reverb/Delay" (eight algorithms) mono-in/stereo-out processors (chainable in series) were routed as send/return, so in multitimbral Combination and Sequencer Modes, each Timbre or Timbre Group has independent Master send levels. Finally there is a basic low/high shelving EQ before the Trinity main outputs.

== Models and upgrades ==
The Trinity series launched with four different models; the base Trinity ($3,599/£2,395/¥270,000 MSRP) featured a synth-weighted 61-note keyboard with channel aftertouch. The Trinity Plus ($3,999/£2,700/¥300,000 MSRP) included the "Solo Synthesizer" board, incorporating the sound engine and effects of the Korg Prophecy for integration into the workstation. This feature was also standard in the higher-end models: the Trinity Pro with synth-weighted 76-note keyboard with channel aftertouch, and the Trinity ProX, offering an 88-note piano-weighted hammer-action keyboard with channel aftertouch and (at least initially) the HDR-TRI 4-track digital recorder plus SCSI and digital audio interface expansion.

All Trinity models were capable of being enhanced with the same multiple expansion options.

The PBS-TRI expansion board ($949/£625 MSRP) featured 8MB of PCM flash-ROM for loading Akai, Korg, and AIFF format samples and also included two separate S-RAM chips to be installed in sockets on the Trinity main PCB that were activated when the PBS-TRI board was installed, resulting in doubled sound-patch memory locations for Programs (increased to 512 by adding Banks "C" & "D"), Combinations (increased to 512 by adding Banks "C" & "D"), Drum Kits (increased to 24), and any installed Solo/MOSS DSP synthesizer (increased to 128) .

The HDR-TRI upgrade ($899/£599 MSRP) transformed the Trinity into a four-track hard disk recording and editing platform, adding SCSI, S/PDIF and analog audio inputs, and also enabling external audio procerssing through Trinity's Master Effects processors (only).

An SCSI-TRI option (redundant if HDR-TRI installed) ($599/£399 MSRP) added SCSI interfacing to external high-speed mass-storage like hard and/or optical drives.

The DI-TRI 4-channel ADAT-compatible digital audio interface with word clock synchronization ($349/£225 MSRP).

The SOLO-TRI "Solo DSP Synthesizer" option ($599/£475 MSRP, already included as standard in Trinity "Plus"/"Pro"/"ProX" models), compatible with Korg Prophecy soundpatches, was also available separately for the base Trinity. A Trinity version 1 or 2 operating system is required to utilize an installed SOLO-TRI board and enable access to Program "Bank S" containing Solo DSP Synthesizer soundpatches.

Later (replacing the SOLO-TRI on the market), the MOSS-TRI "MOSS DSP Synthesizer" (6-polyphony) option ($600 MSRP) compatible with Korg Z1 soundpatches (included factory installed in Trinity "V3" models) was available separately. A Trinity version 3 operating system is required to utilize an installed MOSS-TRI board and enable access to Program "Bank M" containing MOSS DSP Synthesizer soundpatches. (Trinity featured one internal DSP synthesizer expansion socket, so only one SOLO-TRI or else one MOSS-TRI expansion board may be installed at a time.)

All Trinity expansion options were designed for installation only by authorized service centers or dealers (installation labor costs not included in MSRP), not by end-users, and required accessing Trinity's main internals, exposing its power supply circuitry. Therefore, expansion option installation instructions were available only to service centers and dealers, and are not included in expansion option user manuals. In practice, the expansion option boards installed via simple sockets similar to personal computer boards, some also secured with metal brackets and screws (but soldering two wires was required with DI-TRI installation).

=== Trinity VSTi ===
On October 28, 2025, Korg released a VSTi software version of the Classic Korg Trinity, complete with all of its expansion packs (TFD-1S MEGA PIANOS, TFD-2S ORCHESTRAL ELEMENTS, TFD-3S DANCE WAVES & DRUMS, TFD-4S M1 FACTORY), plus all of the additional samples from 1998's TR-Rack sound module. The software is available as part of the Korg Collection of VST software (currently the 6th iteration of the collection) meant to replicate their previous hardware synths.

== Trinity V3 ==
In late 1998, Korg updated its Trinity series by replacing the Solo board in the Trinity Plus, Pro, and ProX models with the MOSS (Multi Oscillator Synthesis System) board, a technology previously utilized in the Prophecy and Z1 synthesizers. This update led to the introduction of the Trinity V3 models (V3 $2,899/£1,899 MSRP, Pro V3, ProX V3), which were equipped with the MOSS board. The inclusion of six extra voices from the Z1 in the V3 models not only expanded the Trinity's polyphony to 38 but also allowed the workstation to leverage the Z1's modelled sounds through the Trinity's superior effects. Additionally, Korg offered the MOSS-TRI board as a standalone upgrade ($600 MSRP) for existing Trinity owners, providing an opportunity to retrofit the advanced synthesis capabilities of the MOSS technology in place of the original Solo board.

== TR-Rack Expanded ACCESS Synthesizer Module ==
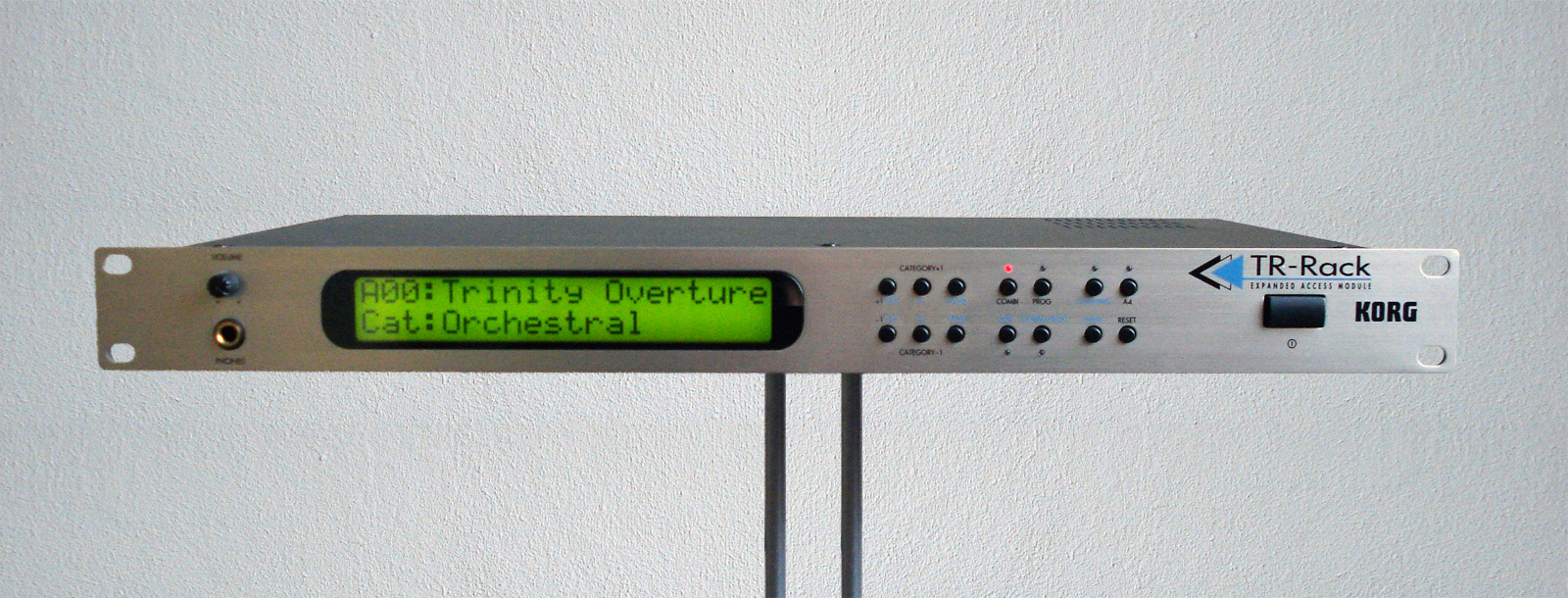
Korg TR-Rack soundmodule (1998)

Late 1997 saw the launch of the TR-Rack "Expanded ACCESS" synthesizer module ($1,599/£999 MSRP), a 1U rackmount version of the Trinity synthesizer and effects system (without sequencer or floppy disk drive) that was fully patch-compatible with Trinity ACCESS-synthesis (but not Solo or MOSS DSP-synthesis). The "Expanded" designation effectively added a fixed PCM-ROM version of the PBS-TRI, both expanding the original 24MB PCM-ROM to 32MB (an additional 40 multisamples and 200 drum samples) and doubling the ACCESS-synthesis patch memory of Programs, Combinations, and Drum Kits. However, the 1U size of the TR-Rack meant severely cut-down and/or cumbersome front-panel synthesizer, effects, and Combination editability due to the relatively very small (but physically scaled-up in dimensions) 20-character x 2-line non-graphic display and few control buttons (although Korg included a TR-Rack specific version of Emagic SoundDiver sound-patch editor/librarian Win/Mac PC software). Further, TR-Rack did not offer any of the Trinity's expansion options, except for the DI-TRI. Finally, the lack of floppy disk drive local storage meant that an external PC or SysEX (system exclusive data) storage device via MIDI transmission was necessary to achieve any sound-patch data updates or backup.

== See also ==
- Korg Triton
