= Korg Kronos =

Music workstation

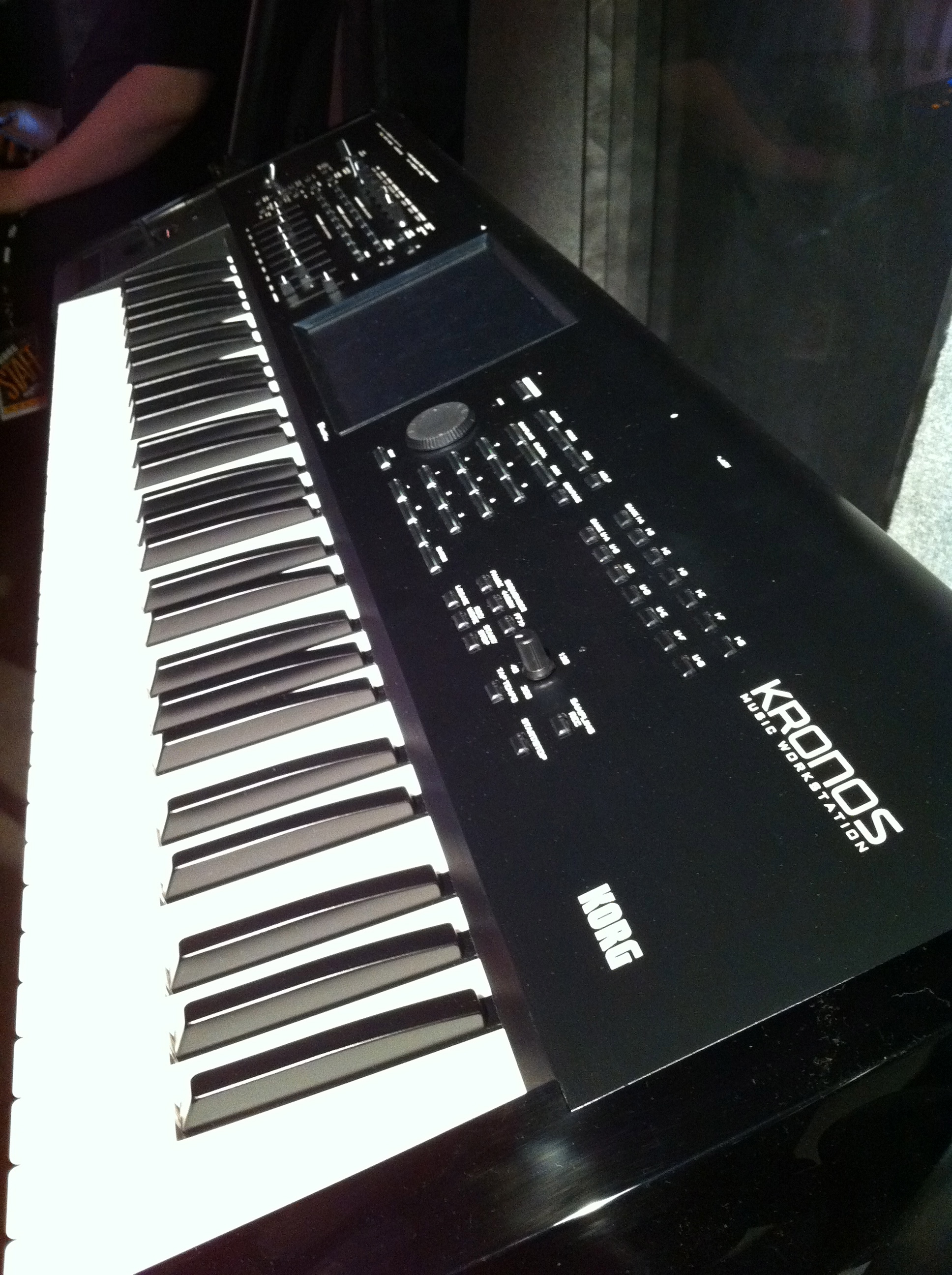
- Manufacturer: Korg
- Dates: 2011–2022; 2025 – present
- Price: $2,800-$3,500

Technical specifications
- Polyphony: up to 200 voices
- Timbrality: 16
- Synthesis type: Sample-based synthesis, Physical modeling synthesis, Wave sequencing, Frequency modulation synthesis
- Aftertouch expression: Yes
- Velocity expression: Yes
- Storage memory: Kronos: 1,664 programs, 1,792 combos, 152 drum kits, 256 GM2 programs and 9 GM2 drum kits. 30GB internal SSD, 2GB internal RAM (1GB available for samples) Kronos X / 2: 62GB internal SSD, 3GB internal RAM (2GB available for samples) Kronos 3: 120GB internal SSD
- Effects: 12 insert effects, 2 master effects, 2 total effects. 185 effect types, 783 presets, 1 EQ per track
- Hardware: Kronos / X: Intel Atom D510/D525 processor soldered on an Intel D510MO/D525MW motherboard Kronos 2: Intel Atom D2550 processor soldered on an ASRock IMB-140D Plus motherboard Kronos 3: Intel Celeron J3160 processor soldered on an ASRock J3160TM-ITX motherboard

Input/output
- Keyboard: 61-key semi-weighted, 73- and 88-key piano-weighted
- External control: Damper pedal, assignable switch, assignable pedal

The Kronos is a music workstation manufactured by Korg that combines nine different synthesizer sound engines with a sequencer, digital recorder, effects, a color touchscreen display and a keyboard. Korg's latest flagship synthesizer series at the time of its announcement, the Kronos series was announced at the winter NAMM Show in Anaheim, California in January 2011.

Much like Kronos' predecessor and Korg's previous flagship synthesizer workstation, the OASYS, Kronos is basically a custom software synthesizer running on an Intel x86 processor and operating system based on the Linux kernel with RTAI extensions; it includes 9 different sound engines which encompass the entire range of Korg synthesis technologies.

The Kronos X was introduced in July 2012 with OS version 2 and the Kronos 2 with OS version 3 was announced in November 2014 (marketed as "new Kronos"). Updated versions have more memory and new factory sounds, but otherwise have similar hardware based on the Intel Atom processor series, so older models can be upgraded to the newer specs with user-installable OS updates and sound banks. In February 2022 Kronos OS version 3.1.4 was released.

Kronos was an end-of-life product from 2022 until it was reintroduced in January 2025 with an updated processor, larger SSD storage and OS version 3.2.

== Sound engines ==
Like its predecessor, the OASYS, the Kronos has multiple sound engines:

1) The SGX-1 Premium Piano sound engine uses continuous (not looped) stereo piano samples sampled at eight velocity layers per key to produce a Steinway-styled "German Grand" or Yamaha-styled "Japanese Grand" acoustic grand piano; an optional Bösendorfer-styled "Austrian Grand" sound set is available. The samples are directly streamed from the internal solid state drive by using VMT (Virtual Memory Technology). This synth engine didn't exist on Korg Oasys.

With the release of Kronos 2, SGX-2 Premium Piano superseded the SGX-1 sound engine. SGX-2 adds modeled string resonance and support for soft pedal samples and 12 velocity layers per key, making possible a new Bechstein-styled "Berlin Grand" soundset which is factory installed on the Kronos 2. Older Kronos models receive an OS update which includes the SGX-2 engine.

2) The EP-1 MDS Electric Piano sound engine offers four models based on specific classic Rhodes electric pianos and two based on Wurlitzer pianos, with software control over hammers, tines, reeds, and mechanical noise elements. It also simulates amplifiers, cabinets, speakers, and effects associated with those historic electric pianos. This synth engine didn't exist on Korg Oasys.

3) The CX-3 Tonewheel Organ engine is carried over from the Korg CX-3 modeled tonewheel organ released in 2001 (not Korg's 1980 CX-3 based on octave-divider technology). The CX-3 engine models a classic tonewheel organ, including rotary speaker effects, vibrato and chorus effects, and tube amplifier. Nine hardware sliders on the Kronos' control panel function as organ drawbar controllers. This synth engine first appeared on Korg Oasys. A significant upgrade to this engine was made in November 2013 with OS 2.1 which improved both the organ model and the Leslie speaker simulation, and was accompanied by two extra banks of organ patches.

4) The HD1 High Definition Synthesizer, which Korg first introduced in the OASYS, uses sample-based synthesis and wave sequencing to generate sounds from the multisamples stored on an internal solid state drive. The capacity of the built-in preset PCM ROM is 314 MB.

5) The MS-20EX Legacy Analog Collection models an expanded version of the original Korg MS-20 semi-modular monophonic analog synthesizer originally released in 1978. This engine is basically an update to the version released by Korg in their "Legacy Collection" software. It is also found on Korg Oasys as part of the LAC-1 engine.

6) The PolysixEX Legacy Analog Collection models an expanded version of the 6-voice Korg Polysix analog synthesizer produced by Korg from 1982-3. Similar to the MS-20EX, this engine is also an update to the version in Korg's "Legacy Collection" software, and can be found on Korg Oasys as part of the LAC-1 engine.

7) The AL-1 Analog Synthesizer models analog subtractive synthesis, with a range of modeled oscillator waveforms, filters, hard sync, analog-style FM, and ring modulation. This is another sound engine passed down from the Korg Oasys.

8) The MOD-7 Waveshaping VPM Synthesizer is capable of classic FM sounds and has import compatibility with Yamaha DX7 SysEx formatted sounds. The MOD-7 engine also combines Variable Phase Modulation (VPM), waveshaping, ring modulation, samples, subtractive synthesis, and modular patching to create a wider range of sounds than would have been possible on a classic Yamaha DX-series synthesizer. This synth engine first appeared on Korg Oasys.

9) The STR-1 Plucked Strings engine creates sounds derived from the physical properties of struck or plucked string sounds. This sound engine is well-suited for creating sounds like guitar, harpsichord and clavinet, harp, and bell sounds, as well as other sounds based on the physics of a plucked string but not directly related to any known instrument. The STR-1 was first released as an expansion to the Korg Oasys.

== Other capabilities ==
The Kronos is available in several keyboard configurations. The standard lineup consists of 61-key, 73-key, and 88-key models. The 73-key and 88-key versions feature a weighted, graded hammer action keyboard, while the 61-key version utilizes a semi-weighted synth action. In 2017, Korg released the Kronos LS, a variant of the Kronos 2 that replaces the heavier hammer action with a light-touch keyboard, reducing the overall weight of the instrument by 14 pounds (6.3 kg) compared to the standard 88-key version.

The Kronos has a 16-track MIDI sequencer combined with a 16-track 24-bit audio recorder. The recorder can record up to four tracks simultaneously.

197 effect types are available. They can be applied as 16 internal effects, 12 insert effects, 2 master effects, & 2 total effects. In addition to these effects, a separate 3-band EQ for each track is available.

Kronos features the Kay Algorithmic Realtime Music Architecture, or KARMA, a complex arpeggiator that generates complex musical phrases in realtime based on the input of a performer. KARMA was developed by Stephen Kay and first appeared in the Korg KARMA keyboard workstation.

Kronos is capable of sampling audio and has full sample editing functionality. Sample import and export are supported. Import sample formats supported include Korg, Akai, SoundFont, WAV and AIFF files.

Kronos sounds can be computer edited using Kronos editor software. Kronos can also be integrated within a computer digital audio workstation as a software plug-in.

== Notable users ==
- Kiefer (musician)
- Robert Glasper
- Ilaiyaraja
- A. R. Rahman
- Adam Blackstone
- Arca (musician)
- Felix Cavaliere (The Rascals, Ringo Starr & His All-Starr Band)
- Chick Corea
- Tom Coster
- Jae Deal (Janet Jackson, Diane Warren)
- Eldar Djangirov
- George Duke
- Gary Barlow
- Spike Edney (Queen)
- Keith Emerson
- Russell Ferrante
- Ike Stubblefield
- Mike Finnigan
- Guy Fletcher (Dire Straits, Mark Knopfler)
- Eloy Fritsch
- Peter Gabriel
- Jem Godfrey
- Larry Goldings
- Herbie Hancock
- Tuomas Holopainen (Nightwish)
- Bob Katsionis (Firewind, OUTLOUD)
- Jeff Lorber
- Chris Lowe (Pet Shop Boys)
- Simon Mavin (Hiatus Kaiyote)
- Lyle Mays (Pat Metheny Group)
- Frank McComb
- Kevin Parker (Tame Impala)
- Greg Phillinganes (Michael Jackson: The Immortal World Tour)
- Mark Ronson
- Simon Davidson
- Jordan Rudess (Dream Theater)
- David Sancious (Bruce Springsteen, Peter Gabriel)
- Derek Sherinian
- Çağri Tozluoğlu (Karnataka)
- Vangelis
- Adam Wakeman
- Rick Wakeman (Yes, ARW)
- Scott Storch
- Yanni
- The Roots
- Bill Payne (Little Feat)
- Cory Henry

== Time line - models ==
1. 2011 Kronos - 2GB RAM, 30GB SSD
2. 2012 Kronos X - Doubled the size of the internal memory and SSD.
3. 2015 Kronos 2 - Major redesign including gold plated sockets, new generation Intel CPU, etc, top of keyboard casing, ventilation mesh, OS V3 (including SGX-2), famous songs library
4. 2016 Kronos 88 Platinum Limited Edition - Identical to Kronos 2 but with platinum color
5. 2017 Kronos 88 Gold Limited Edition - Identical to Kronos 2 but with gold color
6. 2017 Kronos LS - Kronos 2 with light-touch keyboard (only 88), 14 lbs lighter than Kronos 2 88, OS v3.1, sunburst side panels
7. 2019 Kronos Special Edition - Identical to Kronos 2, includes EXs21 Italian F from Korg Grandstage and EXs272 KApro Showcase sound libraries, red/black finish
8. 2020 Kronos Titanium Limited Edition (61 & 88) - Identical to Kronos 2, includes EXs21 Italian F from Korg Grandstage. Brushed metal finish with maple real wood end cheeks
9. 2025 Kronos 3 - Kronos 3 with a new Black look, an upgraded CPU, new updated firmware, 3GB RAM, 128GB of storage space, and tons of added EXs libraries.
