= Korg Prophecy =

Synthesizer released in 1995

Prophecy
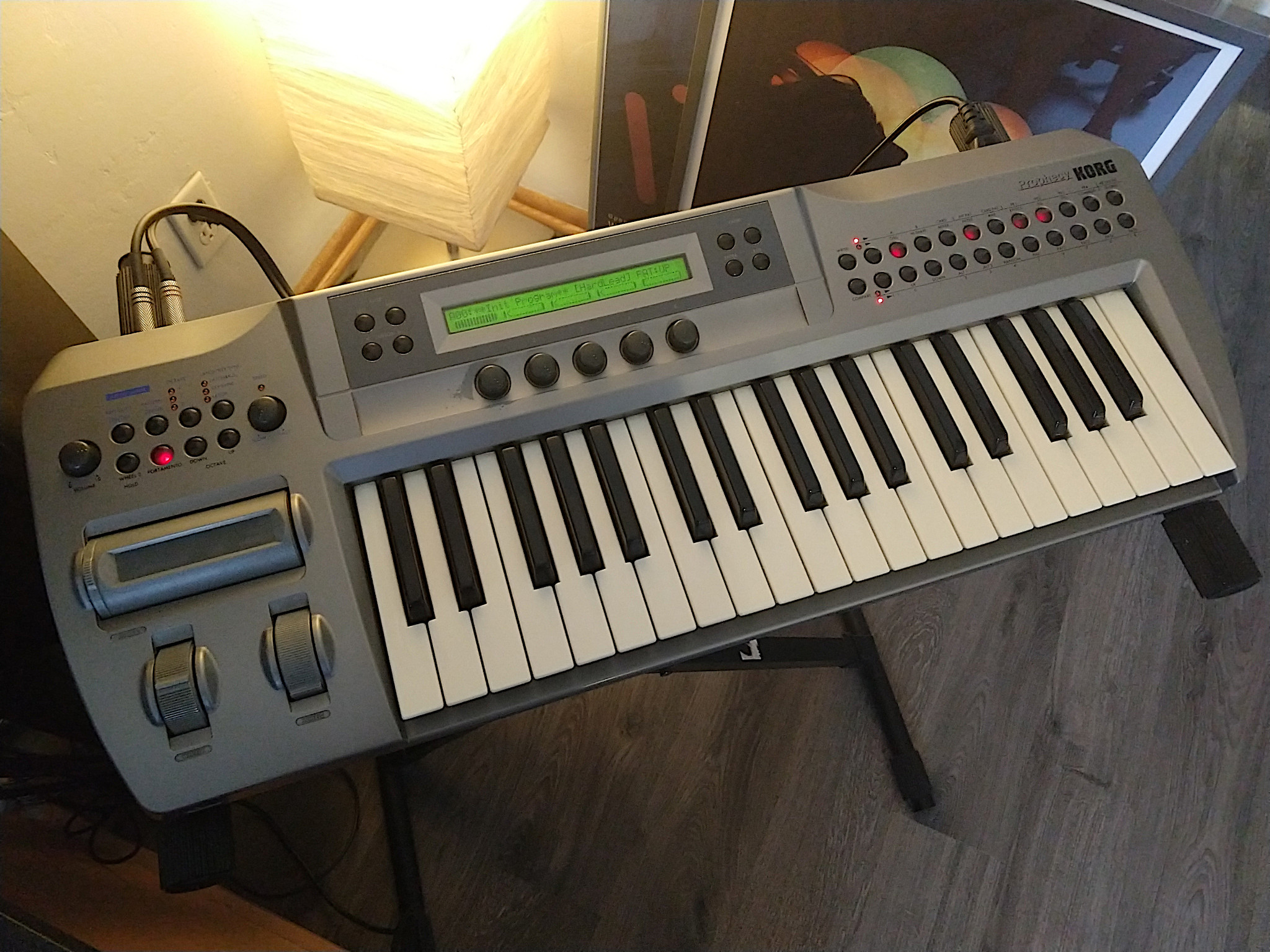
- Prophecy
- Manufacturer: Korg
- Dates: 1995-1997
- Price: £1000/$1595

Technical specifications
- Polyphony: Monophonic
- Timbrality: Monotimbral
- Oscillator: 2 Oscillators (1 in physical modelling) + Sub-Oscillator + Noise
- LFO: 4 (30 types)
- Synthesis type: Analog-modelling; Noise + comb filter Variable phase modulation Modulation; Physical modelling
- Filter: 2 multi‑mode resonant filters
- Attenuator: 4
- Aftertouch expression: yes
- Velocity expression: yes
- Storage memory: 128 patches
- Effects: Distortion, wah, reverb, delay, chorus, flanger, 2-band parametric EQ

Input/output
- Keyboard: 37 keys
- Left-hand control: Pitch, modulation, log Wheel with ribbon
- External control: MIDI (In, Out, Thru)

The Korg Prophecy is a monophonic synthesizer released by Korg in 1995. one of the earliest commercial DSP physical/acoustic and analog "virtual" modeling sound synthesizers and Korg's first monophonic synthesizer since the Mono/Poly. The Prophecy employs Korg's Multi Oscillator Synthesis System (MOSS), which features digital oscillators capable of emulating synthesis techniques such as analog synthesis, FM and physical modelling. Emphasized for its portability, expressiveness, and engaging playability, a distinctive feature of the Prophecy is its multifunctional Wheel 3, nicknamed the 'log'.

== Background ==
In the mid-1990s, the synthesizer market was dominated by digital, sample-based workstations, notably the Korg M1 and its follow-ups. Analog synthesizers subsequently saw a decline in popularity, with musicians and manufacturers turning their attention to the more contemporary, menu-driven ROMplers.

The creation of the Prophecy was significantly influenced by the Korg OASYS project, an ambitious synthesizer concept that didn't reach the market due to its high cost and computational demands. Despite OASYS not being commercially released, its innovative approach to sound generation impacted the development of both the Prophecy and the Korg Trinity, which were released simultaneously. Positioned as a more accessible alternative to the expensive Trinity, the Prophecy stood out with its innovative 'log' controller and its analog modelling capabilities, enabling it to emulate classic analog synth characteristics as well as modern sounds.

== Sounds and Features ==
The Prophecy is programmed through five Performance Editor knobs, which also allow for real-time sound adjustments during live performances, complemented by multi-function buttons. It offers five synthesis methods encompassing nine oscillator types: analog, variable phase modulation, brass, reed, and plucked string modelling, noise with comb filtering, and three types of analog-style models - sync, ring modulation, and cross modulation, collectively referred to as 'MOD'.

Each oscillators is processed by a linked waveshaper for generating distortion or resonance effects. This signal, combined with outputs from a sub-oscillator and noise generator, and feedback, is then fed through two multi-mode filters, which can be arranged in series, parallel, or split configurations. Each filter directs the signal to a dedicated amplifier; these outputs are subsequently blended and sent through a stereo effects chain, concluding with pan control.

The Prophecy's modulation options include six multi-stage envelopes and four low-frequency oscillators (LFOs) with a selection of 30 types. The keyboard features velocity sensitivity and aftertouch and is complemented by three physical wheels dedicated to pitch bending, modulation, and the Wheel 3, a cylindrical control that combines a modulation wheel with a pressure- and position-responsive ribbon controller. The programmable effects include, in series, overdrive, wah-wah, distortion, chorus, flanger, panning, 2-band parametric EQ, delay, and reverb. Additionally, the Prophecy features an arpeggiator that can cover one to four octaves and offers ten pattern options—five presets and five that are user-definable.

It is equipped with five programmable Performance Editors (PE) knobs, each of which can control up to four parameters simultaneously, enabling precise manipulation of aspects like filter cutoff frequencies, envelope attack times, filter resonance, and stereo panning with a single turn. These knobs are used for real-time sound modulation and editing, as well as for managing the Prophecy's arpeggiator functions, interfaced through the 2-line LCD screen.

== Legacy ==
The Korg Prophecy was succeeded by the Korg Z1, released in 1997, which expanded upon its foundation to include twelve-note polyphony, six-part multitimbrality, a wider variety of oscillator options, a polyphonic arpeggiator, and a performance interface featuring an XY touchpad. The Z1 also made changes and lost some features of the Prophecy's core synthesis engine and effects system.

The Z1's MOSS engine was subsequently integrated into plugin expansion boards for Korg's workstation synthesizers, including the MOSS-TRI (1998) for Korg Trinity V3, and EXB-MOSS (1999) for Korg Triton "Classic", Triton-Rack, Karma, Triton Studio, and Triton Extreme, enabling identical synthesis capabilities, but with changes to polyphony, effects system, timbrality, and storage, to be accessible in those models.

The Prophecy gained popularity among dance and techno artists, particularly for its analog emulations. It appeared on tracks by Radiohead, Depeche Mode, Pet Shop Boys, The Chemical Brothers, Apollo 440, 808 State, BT and Orbital. It was used extensively by The Prodigy on every track of The Fat of the Land, including the main acid-inspired riff in "Smack My Bitch Up".

In 2021, Korg released a software plugin version of the Prophecy as part of the Korg Collection 3, which offers a digital emulation of the Prophecy with the addition of polyphony and unison mode.
