= Yamaha SY22 =

Combined FM synthesis/sample-based synthesiser introduced by Yamaha in 1990

SY22
- Manufacturer: Yamaha
- Dates: 1990
- Price: 1890 Deutsche Mark

Technical specifications
- Polyphony: 16 notes at 32 voices
- Timbrality: 8
- Oscillator: 2 AWM, 2 FM (2 operators per voice 8 waveforms)
- LFO: 4
- Synthesis type: 2-Operator-FM synthesiser Frequency modulation 12-bit Digital 1 MB sample based ROM, 12 bit, 22 kHz Sample-based Vector
- Filter: none
- Storage memory: 64 ROM sounds, 64 user sounds, 16 ROM multis, 16 user multis, additional sounds via MCD32 or MCD64 memory cards

Input/output
- Keyboard: 61 keys, velocity-sensitive, channel aftertouch
- Left-hand control: Pitch-bend, modulation wheel, Vectorstick X, Y (Controller #16, #17)
- External control: MIDI

The SY22 is a combined FM synthesis/sample-based synthesiser introduced by Yamaha in 1990, building on the vector synthesis technology developed by Sequential Circuits prior to their demise and takeover by Yamaha in 1987.

== Features ==
The SY22 has 61 (five octaves) unweighted velocity sensitive keys with aftertouch. It can play back up to 32 voices or 16 notes. Each sound programme uses two or four voices. There are two different programme configurations, being either one AWM (Yamaha's PCM technology) and one FM element (voice) or two AWM and two FM elements. There are sixty four factory pre set sound programmes and sixteen pre set multimode programmes in ROM. The same amount of storage space can be used for user programmes. The user memory can be doubled with an optional battery buffered RAM card (MCD32). The AWM part does not have filters or other wave shaping functionality. The FM section uses two operators per voice and offers eight selectable FM waveforms. The FM synthesis parameters are not fully editable from the synthesizer itself, limiting direct control over sound design. The Multi mode combines up to eight sound programmes which can be played at once.

== Vector synthesis ==
The vector stick has two alternating functions. It can either blend between the two or four sound elements or detune them against each other. These movements can also be recorded in up to fifty steps and repeated for each note played. The vector envelope can also be programmed manually. Stick movements are sent via MIDI. The fifty steps makes it the most complex envelope of any synthesiser until today (April 2022). Each single step has a start vector and two duration parameters. The vectors' positions are defined on X- and Y-axes (-31..0..+31). The duration parameters are a time in milliseconds plus a multiplier. For the time a length between 10 and 160ms can be chosen while the multiplier can defined with up to 254 repetitions. With use of the longest step time of 160 ms, the full 254 repetitions and all fifty vector movements a complete sound progression length of up to thirty three minutes and fifty two seconds can be achieved with a single key press.

== Versions ==
- Yamaha TG33

A keyless synthesiser designed for the desktop. The TG33 doubles the number of voices and the number of sounds in a Multi programme. The user memory can be doubled or even tripled with an MCD64 card.

- Yamaha SY35

The SY35 has the same technical data as the SY22 with the exception of a partly different set of samples in higher sampling quality (16 bit instead of 12 bit).

== Notable users ==
- Moby
- Skinny Puppy
- Scanner
- Wry Yelp
