= Korg OASYS =

Workstation synthesizer

OASYS
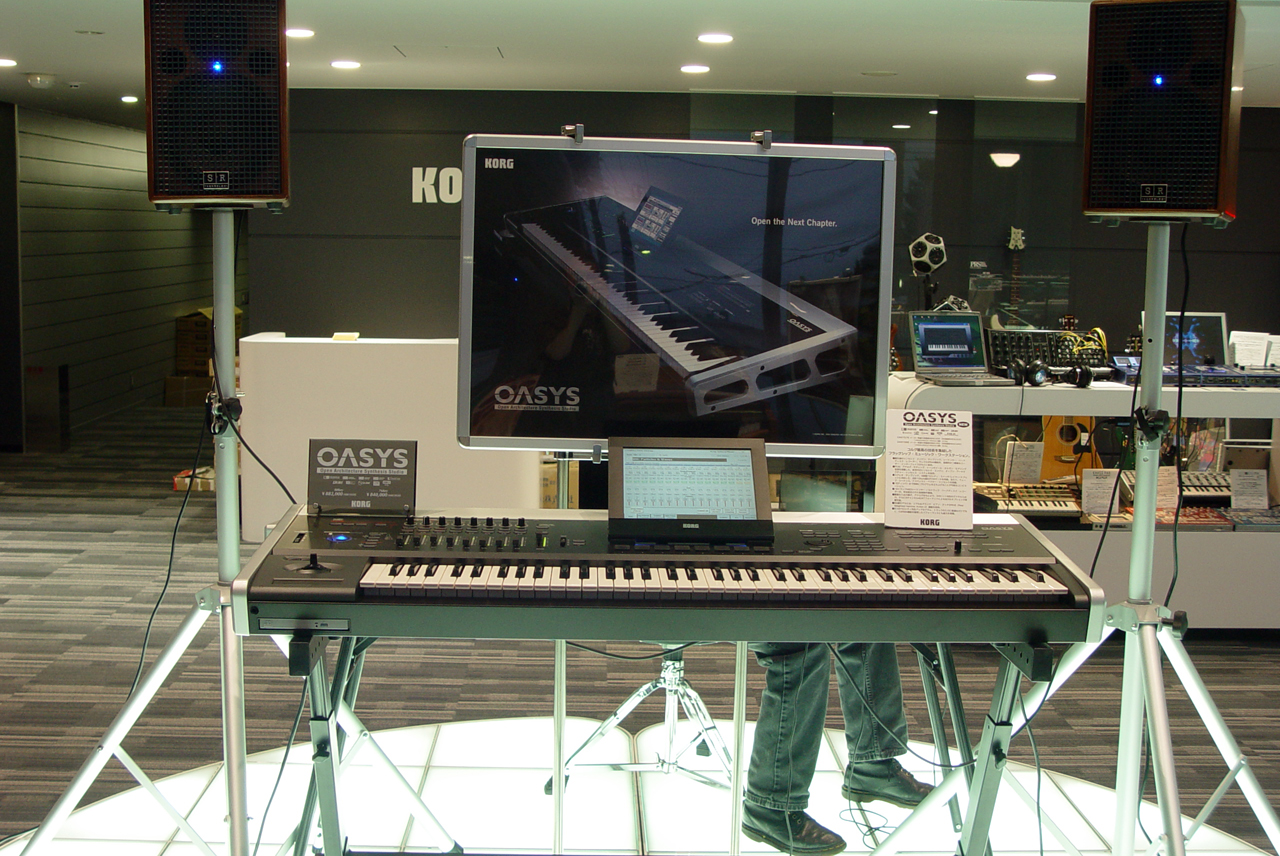
- Korg OASYS
- Manufacturer: Korg
- Dates: 2005–2009
- Price: $8,000–$8,500

Technical specifications
- Polyphony: 172 for HD-1, CX-3, & PolysixEX; 96 for AL-1; 52 for MOD-7; 48 for STR-1 & MS-20EX (all maximum; may vary depending on other sounding voices and effects)
- Timbrality: 16
- Oscillator: depends on synthesis engine
- Synthesis type: PCM, Wave Sequencing, Vector, Physical Modelling, Sampler, Analog Modelling
- Filter: depends on synthesis engine
- Aftertouch expression: yes
- Velocity expression: yes
- Storage memory: 1GB RAM, upgradable to 2GB. No physical ROM. Preloaded samples include 314MB "ROM" (loaded into RAM automatically at startup), and optionally-loaded 313MB EXs1 "ROM Expansion" & 503MB EXs2 "Concert Grand Piano."; 0MB to 1.5GB available for user samples, depending on memory configuration and loaded EXs. Internal 40GB HDD.
- Effects: 12 insert, 2 master, 2 total
- Hardware: 2.8 GHz Intel Pentium 4 processor

Input/output
- Keyboard: 76 or 88-key
- Left-hand control: 2x Joystick, 2x Switch, Ribbon, KARMA
- External control: MIDI

The Korg OASYS is a workstation synthesizer released in early 2005, 1 year after the successful Korg Triton Extreme. Unlike the Triton series, the OASYS uses a custom Linux operating system that was designed to be arbitrarily expandable via software updates, with its functionality limited only by the PC-like hardware.

OASYS is a software implementation of the research project that ultimately resulted in the OASYS PCI, a DSP card which offered multiple synthesis engines. The original OASYS keyboard concept had to be scrapped because of excessive production costs and limitations of then-current technology.

Production of the OASYS was officially discontinued in April 2009. Korg sold just over 3000 units worldwide. The final software update was released on November 24, 2009.

In 2011, Korg Kronos, a successor of Korg OASYS, was introduced at that year's NAMM Show.

== Features ==
The standard Oasys comes with hardware similar to many personal computers:

- 2.8 GHz Pentium 4 CPU
- 40GB hard disk drive
- 1GB DDR RAM, user-expandable to 2GB
- 10.4" LCD touch screen

It features Korg's OASYS (acronym for Open Architecture SYnthesis Studio) technology, which allows multiple synthesis engines to be used simultaneously. The OASYS also includes second-generation KARMA technology (with the first generation having first appeared in the Korg KARMA). It has either a 76 key synth-action, or 88 key hammer-action keyboard.

== Options ==
EXB-DI (Digital interface board)

The optional EXB-DI adds 8 channels of ADAT Optical format 24-bit 48 kHz digital output, as well as a word clock input. The EXB-DI was first made available for the Korg Triton Studio keyboard and Triton Rack module - on these units only 6 outputs are available via ADAT. Bar a few early models of the Oasys, the EXB-DI is user installable.

== Synthesis engines ==
As of November 24, 2009 the latest version of the OASYS OS is 1.3.3a, featuring the following synthesis engines:

1. HD-1: A PCM synthesizer, with 628 MB of preloaded samples and Wave Sequencing.
2. EXs: A sample library that works by itself or with other engines. EXs-1 is a set of instruments and EXs-2 is a grand piano.
3. AL-1: A 96-note polyphonic virtual analog synthesizer (84 notes in previous versions of the OS)
4. CX-3: A modeled tonewheel organ based on the current CX-3
5. STR-1: A plucked string physical model
6. LAC-1: Optional bundle (originally $249.00, but now available for free) including two virtual analog synthesizers, the PolysixEX and MS-20EX, which are updated models of the vintage Korg Polysix and Korg MS20. The LAC-1 is available as a free upgrade, but has to be requested by the current owner of the OASYS from Korg.
7. MOD-7: Optional (originally $249.00, but now available for free) that Combines Variable Phase Modulation (VPM), waveshaping, ring modulation, PCM sample playback, and subtractive synthesis in a patchable, semi-modular synthesizer. The MOD-7 is available as a free upgrade, but has to be requested by the current owner of the OASYS from Korg.

=== HD-1 ===
==== HD-1 Program ====
The HD-1 is a sample+synthesis engine with a two "oscillator" structure. In addition to the two "oscillators," an HD-1 Program contains a Vector Envelope, Common LFO (per-program as opposed to per-voice, similar to the modulation LFOs in some early polyphonic analog synths), two common key tracking generators, KARMA settings, and effects.

==== HD-1 Oscillator ====
Each "oscillator" consists of a sample playback oscillator, dual multimode filter, nonlinear "drive" and low boost section, amp, and pan. The sample playback oscillator has four velocity zones, each of which can play a mono or stereo sample or a Wave Sequence. Velocity zones can overlap or crossfade. Korg claims very low aliasing distortion, due to the use of band limited interpolation.

==== Wave Sequencing ====
Wave Sequences were first introduced on Korg's Wavestation synthesizer, released in 1990. Wave Sequences allow a single note to play through a list of samples, one after the other, with or without crossfades, with other associated parameters changing for each sample, as listed below. This can create smooth, evolving timbres, or rhythmic effects. Internally, Wave Sequences are implemented by using two voices; voice A plays the first sample, voice B plays the second sample, voice A plays the third sample, and so on. Other synthesizers have featured concepts which are similar in some aspects, such as PPG, Waldorf, and Access Virus wavetables, Synclavier resynthesis, and Ensoniq Transwaves and Hyperwaves (see the Ensoniq TS 10).

In the lists below, features new to the OASYS (in comparison to the Wavestation) are noted.

OASYS Wave Sequences include, for each step:

- The sample to play (mono or stereo)
- Sample start offset
- Reverse on/off
- The length of the step, in milliseconds or rhythmic value
- The crossfade time into the next step, in milliseconds
- Crossfade fade-in shape (256 steps, from log to exp)
- Crossfade fade-out shape (as above)
- Volume
- Transpose and fine-tune
- Two modulation ("AMS") value outputs, to control any assignable parameters of the synthesizer in the rest of the Program (e.g. filter cutoff or resonance, LFO speeds, etc.)

And, for the sequence as a whole:

- Time/Tempo mode (determines whether step durations will be in milliseconds or rhythmic values)
- Run on/off (enables and disables programmed durations and crossfades altogether; modulation from other sources can control the sequence directly)
- Key sync on/off (determines whether each note's Wave Sequence runs independently, or whether all notes sync together for lock-step rhythms)
- Swing and swing resolution
- Quantize Triggers on/off (adjusts note start times to match current KARMA/Sequence)
- Start step and start step modulation
- End step
- Loop start, end, and direction (forwards, backwards/forwards, backwards)
- Loop repeats
- Note-on advance (increments the start step for each played note)
- Position modulation (sweeps through the sequence manually)
- Duration modulation (changes the step durations)

===== Differences from the Wavestation =====
Additions to the original Wavestation implementation include time/tempo modes, sample-locked tempo sync, constant-time crossfades in tempo mode, fade-in and fade-out shapes, swing, trigger quantization and key sync, note advance, real-time duration modulation, control of reverse and sample start point per step, and modulation outputs.

=== EXs ===
EXs is a Korg acronym for "EXpansion Sample". They are sample sounds that come pre-loaded with OASYS. EXs-1 is a sample library with acoustic instruments including guitars, brass, piano, strings, beside others. EXs-2 is a grand piano sampled in each key with 4 velocity levels plus damper. The 1G RAM of OASYS only permits to load 1 EXs at a time, but the user can expand it to have both working at the same time.

=== EXs3 ===
EXs3 ($149) includes over 700 MB of brass and woodwind samples, perfect for orchestral and pop productions. Recorded using world-class instruments and players, the collection features piccolo, flute, alto flute, clarinet, bass clarinet, oboe, English horn, bassoon, contrabassoon, soprano sax, alto sax, tenor sax, baritone sax, trumpet, piccolo trumpet, cornet, flugelhorn, trombone, French horn, bass tuba, contrabass tuba, dual-trumpets, dual-trombones, and brass ensemble. Designed to be richly expressive, the samples include multiple dynamics, straight and vibrato versions, breathy and overblown tones, legato, staccato, trills, flutter, growl, sforzando, glissando up/down, falls, doits, voice, breath, attack elements, grace notes, and key noise elements. 128 Programs and 64 Combinations take full advantage of the new sounds.

=== EXi ===
EXi is a Korg acronym for "EXpansion Instrument". It refers to all OASYS synth models other than the HD-1, including the AL-1, CX-3, etc.

==== EXi Program ====
This is the Program structure for playing EXi. It is similar to that of the HD-1, but differs slightly in a few ways, such as:

- Allows selection of any two EXi for layering or splitting
- Adds a "Common" step sequencer, shared by all voices in the Program
- Adds audio input selection for each of the two EXi (currently used by MS-20EX and MOD-7)
- Adds transposition for each EXi

==== AL-1 ====
Virtual analog synth engine.

- Two main oscillators with analog-style FM and sync
  - Korg claims proprietary anti-aliasing technology, for no audible aliasing over standard 88-note range, with sync (but with drive and ring-mod off)
  - Waveforms: Saw, Pulse, Saw/Pulse, Double Saw, Detuned Saw 1, Detuned Saw 2, Triangle, Square/Triangle
  - Wave Morph and Pulse Width/Phase/Detune
- Sub-oscillator
- Audio input
- Noise generator with saturation and dedicated filter
- Ring modulation (Ring Mod, AM, Rectify, Clip)
- Mixer provides modulatable volume and filter A/B pan for osc 1, osc 2, sub osc/audio input, noise generator, and ring mod
- Per-voice, modulatable Drive (nonlinear distortion) and Low Boost (low EQ)
- Dual resonant multimode filters, including "multifilter"
  - Multifilter provides two separate sets of gain controls for LB, HP, BP, and dry signals, with modulatable crossfade between the two sets
- 4 EGs
- 4 LFOs
- 2 "AMS Mixers" (modulation signal processors)
- Per-voice step sequencer

==== CX-3 ====
A modeled tonewheel organ based on Korg's dedicated CX-3 organ keyboard. This organ mimics and in many ways enhances the sound of the Hammond organ and Leslie speaker with amplifier simulation and other enhancements.

==== STR-1 ====
A plucked string physical model that allows you to pluck, strike, scrape, or otherwise "excite" the string with 16 different "pluck" types, noise, or any of the onboard or RAM-based PCM waveforms.

==== LAC-1 ====
The optional LAC-1 Legacy Analog Collection($249.00) EXi adds the MS-20EX and PolysixEX virtual analog synthesizers.

- MS-20EX Runs in demo mode until activated.
- PolysixEX Runs in demo mode until activated.

==== MOD-7 ====
The MOD-7 ($249.00) includes six oscillators which combine simultaneous VPM (aka FM), Waveshaping, and ring modulation, plus a PCM oscillator, noise generator, audio input, two multi-mode filters, three 2-in/1-out mixers, and an input main mixer – with a patch panel for routing them together.

Note: The MOD-7 and PolysixEX/MS-20EX plug-ins are only available from www.korguser.net. Owners must register their Oasys at the site in order to purchase them. This includes providing the Public ID and serial numbers of their unit.

== See also ==
- Korg Kronos
- Korg M3
- Wersi Open-Architecture-System
- Music workstation
