= Korg PS-3300 =

Polyphonic analogue synthesizer

PS-3300
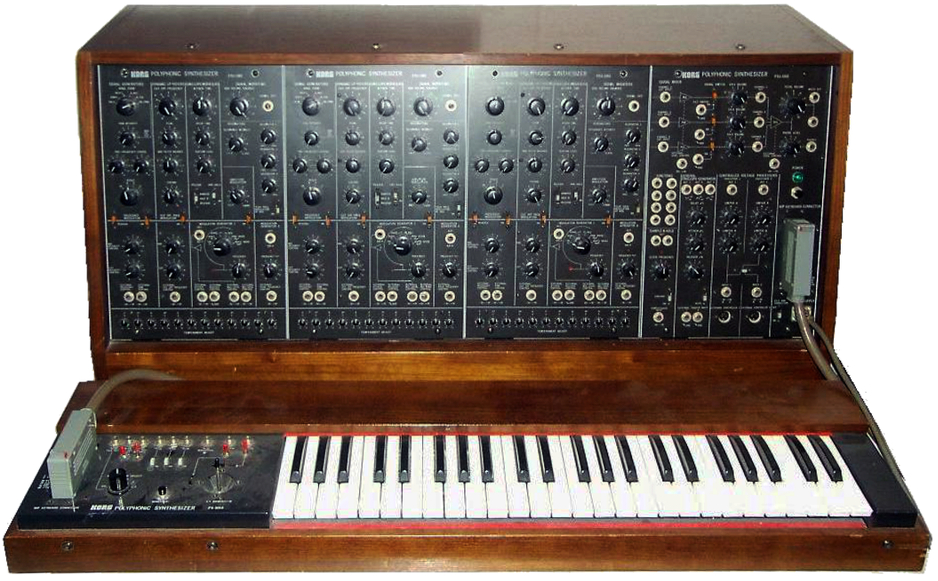
- Korg PS-3300
- Manufacturer: Korg
- Dates: 1977 - 1981
- Price: US$7,500 £5,837 ¥1,200,000 JPY

Technical specifications
- Polyphony: 48-note polyphonic
- Timbrality: Multitimbral
- Oscillator: 12 x 3 VCOs (3VCO per one single octave, 48 divide down counters,48 waveshapers)
- LFO: 6 LFOs
- Synthesis type: Analog subtractive
- Filter: 144 Low-Pass VCFs (3 per key); 9 Band-Pass VCFs
- Attenuator: 144 VCAs (3 per key); 144 Envelopes (3 per key)

Input/output
- Keyboard: 48 keys
- External control: CV/Gate

The Korg PS-3300 is a polyphonic analog synthesizer released by Korg in 1977. It was released alongside the PS-3100, a more compact variant featuring a complete synthesizer voice board for each of its 48 keyboard notes. The PS-3300 essentially combines three PS-3100 units, triggering all voices simultaneously with each key press and mirroring the PS-3100's overall design, featuring a total of 144 synth voices. The PS-3300 uses the PS-3010, a detachable keyboard equipped with an assignable joystick called the X-Y Manipulator.

The PS series also includes the PS-3200, launched in 1978, which upgrades to two voices per key and introduces the capability to save and recall 16 presets. The PS-3200 also substitutes the resonators found in the PS-3100 and PS-3300 with a 7-band equalizer.

== Background ==
At the time the PS-series synthesizers were released, creating polyphonic synthesizers posed significant difficulties for manufacturers. Truly polyphonic instruments, such as the Polymoog, Yamaha CS-80, and Oberheim's SEM-based four- and eight-voice systems, were scarce and in some instances, not fully polyphonic. The construction of synthesizers from expensive discrete components, rather than more accessible oscillator and filter chips, made polyphonic instruments not only costly but also lacking in features.

In 1977, Keio Electronic (now known as Korg) introduced the PS-3100 and PS-3300 polyphonic synthesizers, which had been developed over several years by Korg engineer Fumio Mieda. The PS-3100 was the smaller model and employed a 'divide-down' oscillator architecture, previously utilized in Keio's Polyphonic Ensemble synthesizers, but with significant enhancements. Each note across its 48-note keyboard featured an individual filter, envelope, and amplifier, allowing for simultaneous playing of all keys. It featured a comprehensive selection of modules, an ensemble effect, and a patch panel with 32 inputs and outputs for flexible sound routing.

The PS-3300 essentially comprised three PS-3100 units, providing three independent oscillators, filters, envelopes, and amplifiers for every note. The three modules can be individually adjusted and then mixed at the final output to create multitimbral sounds. It boasted over 60 patch points and included additional features such as sample & hold, a global envelope generator, two voltage processors, independent channel outputs, and mixers for its three synth sections. The PS-3300 did not feature the ensemble effect from the PS-3100. Bob Moog praised the PS-3300 as "the best synthesizer for fat sounds".

== Sounds and features ==
The layout of the front panel clearly shows the modular origins of the Korg PS-3300; oscillators, filters and envelopes are all arranged in vertical narrow strips, much like the front panel of the Moog modular synthesizer, with patch points at the bottom of each strip. The PS synths are semi-modular so no patching is required to start playing. The Korg PS-3300 is three complete synthesizer units in one box, where each synthesizer unit is almost identical to the smaller Korg PS-3100 and is labelled as "PSU-3301" on the front panel.

Each PSU-3301 features a voltage-controlled oscillator (VCO) that offers triangle, pulse, square, pulse-width modulation (PWM), and sawtooth waveforms, with pitch modulation provided by a low-frequency oscillator (LFO). A patch panel socket permits pitch control from the envelopes or other voltage sources. The low-pass voltage-controlled filter (VCF) features cutoff frequency and resonance controls, allowing modulation from both the LFO and the envelope. Keyboard tracking for the VCF frequency and voltage-controlled amplifier (VCA) gain can be adjusted across the keyboard, allowing for emphasizing keyboard sections.

Each PSU-3301 unit is equipped with an envelope modifier with controls for attack, decay, and sustain stages. The release time can be set to damped (no release), half-damped, or set to 'release', where the duration matches the setting of the decay knob, similar to the Minimoog envelope functionality. The PS-series synthesizers each include a single 'general' envelope generator that is shared between all notes. This DAR (delay/attack/release) envelope is primarily connected to the VCF cutoff but can be rerouted to alternate destinations using a patch cable.

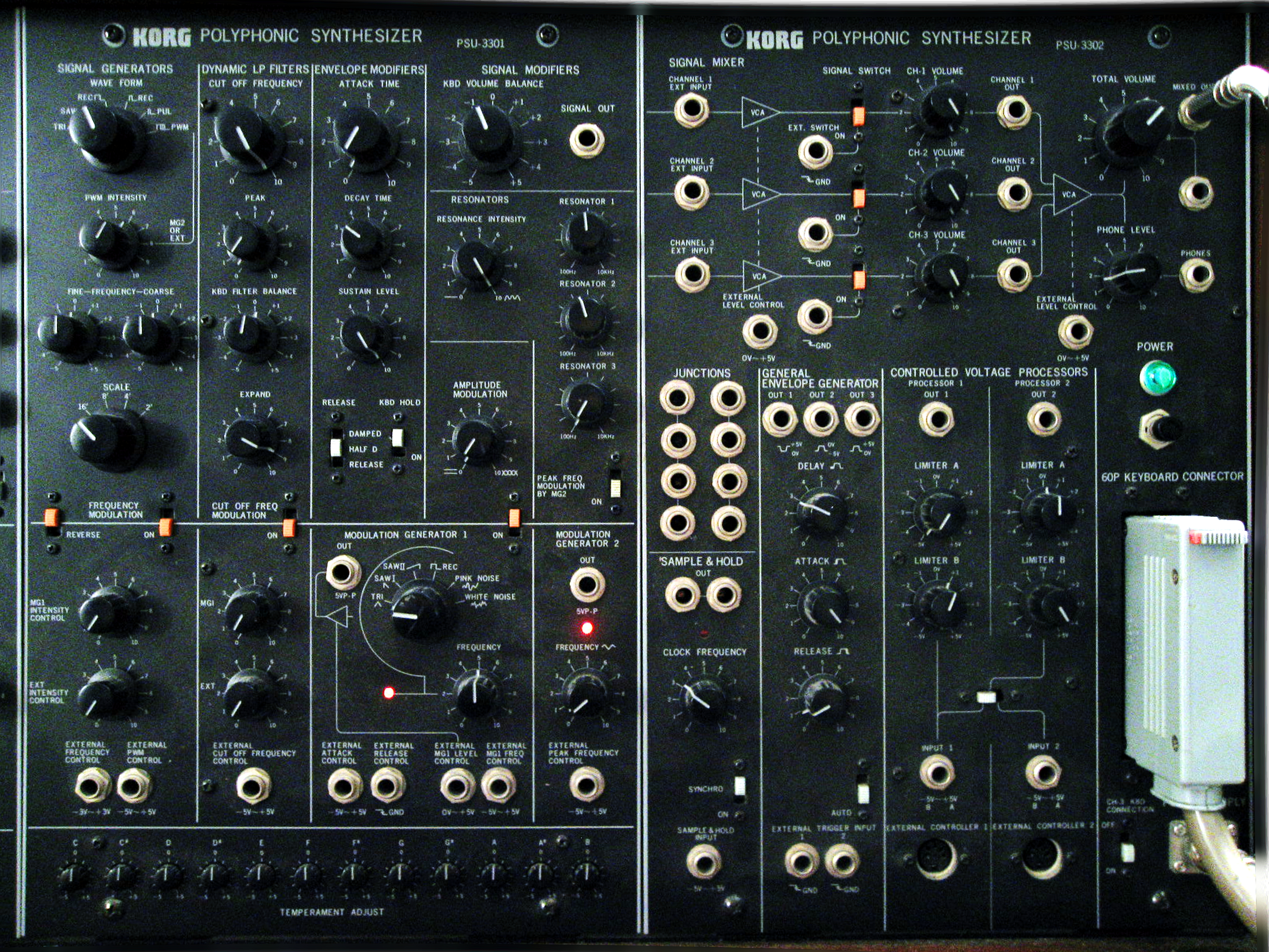
PSU-3301 and PSU-3302 units

Each PSU-3301 module incorporates a three-peak voltage-controllable resonator capable of enhancing frequency bands between 100 Hz and 10 kHz, complete with adjustable bandwidth and frequency controls. This functionality can produce more authentic synthesized 'acoustic' instrument sounds. Additionally, it allows for the modulation of frequency sweeps either manually or through an LFO, envelope, or another modulation source to create vowel and phasing sounds.

Each PS synthesizer features a temperament adjust section with 12 knobs, corresponding to the chromatic scale notes from C to B, allowing the user to independently tune each keyboard note to facilitate the creation of alternative scales.

The PSU-3302 module, located on the far right of the PS-3300, serves as both a mixer and modulation unit, combining audio from the three PSU-3301 modules into a single output channel with dedicated volume controls for both line and headphone outputs. This module also includes three external inputs for integrating effects loops or additional sound sources. Control voltages from an LFO or envelope can modulate the mixed level.

The modulation section of the PSU-3302 features an auxiliary envelope generator with delay and three separate outputs: a standard CV signal, an inverted version, and a voltage offset version. There is also a sample & hold (S&H) module with an adjustable clock frequency, two control voltage processors, and connections for the keyboard and an optional foot controller.

== Accessories ==
The PS series offered several accessories, including the PS-3010 polyphonic keyboard with remote control features, the PS-3040 dual foot-controller pedal for live performances, the PS-3050 48-pin junction box for connecting multiple PS synths, and the PS-3060 remote control programmer for the PS-3200. Additionally, the 60-pin PS-3001 cable facilitated the connection of up to three Korg PS series synthesizers to one keyboard through the PS-3050 junction box, enabling centralized control.

== Legacy ==
Yasuhiko Mori, a designer at Korg, estimates that only 30 to 50 units of the PS-3300 were produced due to its high cost, which was prohibitive for many musicians. In contrast, approximately 300 to 600 units of the PS-3100 were manufactured.

The PS synthesizers quickly became overshadowed by the release of the Sequential Prophet-5 in 1978. Despite the PS series' superior polyphony and routing flexibility, the Prophet 5's digital patch storage was seen as a groundbreaking feature. Nevertheless, the technological advancements from the PS series were integrated into the Korg MS-20 monophonic synthesizer, also launched in 1978. The PS series ceased production by 1981, leading Korg to focus on developing more conventional polysynths, such as the Polysix, Poly-61, and DW synthesizers.

== Modern variants ==
In 2017, Full Bucket Music released a free software emulation of the PS-3300 polyphonic synthesizer, available in VST and AU formats.

In October 2023, Cherry Audio released a software emulation of the PS-3300, created with the Electronic Music Education and Preservation Project (EMEAPP). It comes with AU, VST, VST3, AAX and standalone formats and extends the original features by adding PS- or MS-style filter selection, tempo sync, temperament tuning presets and an effects section.

In 2024, Korg announced plans to release a hardware reissue of the PS-3300, dubbed the PS-3300 FS. This reissue incorporates digital patch storage with 16 banks, each containing 16 slots, USB and MIDI connectivity, and a librarian application for preset organization. The updated model features 49 keys and 49-voice analog polyphony, up from the original's 48.

In October 2025, Korg released the Korg PS-3300 plug-in as part of KORG Collection 6, available in AU, VST3, AAX, and standalone formats. It extends the original features in various ways, including adding a choice of PS-3300 or MS-20 filters, optional separate amp envelopes, choice of modeled PS-3300 or modern exp/log envelope shapes, additional Modulation Processors and LFOs, stereo panning, modeled Ensemble effect from the PS-3100 and PS-3200, White and Pink Noise selections for the oscillators, Sample and Hold LFOs, optional linked inter-panel oscillator phase for string synth and combo organ sounds, and tempo sync options. The plug-in can also import sounds from the hardware PS-3300 FS.
