= Korg Mono/Poly =

Analog synthesizer, manufactured by Korg from 1981 to 1984

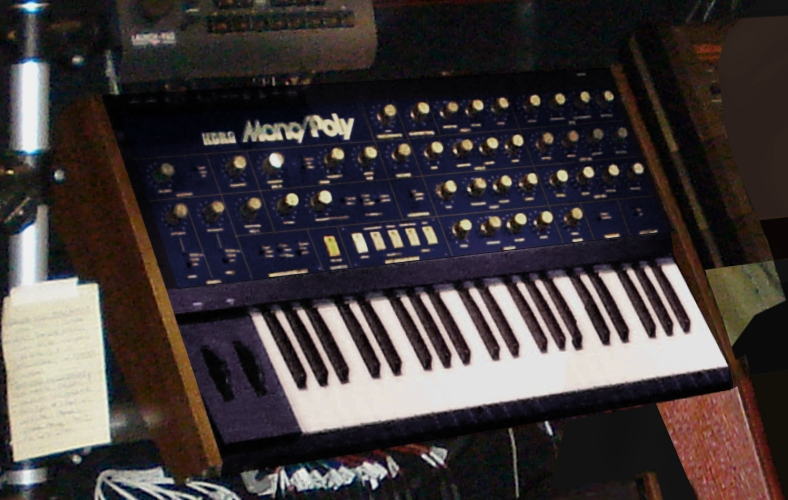
- Korg Mono/Poly
- Manufacturer: Korg (Keio Electronic Laboratories)
- Dates: 1981-1984
- Price: US$995; UK£699

Technical specifications
- Polyphony: 4 voices
- LFO: 2 LFO's w/ individual rates
- Synthesis type: Analog Subtractive
- Filter: VCF, VCF ADSR
- Attenuator: 1 VCA per voice 1 ADSR envelope per voice

Input/output
- Keyboard: 44 keys
- External control: CV/gate and CV Filter

The Korg Mono/Poly (MP-4) is a paraphonic analog synthesizer released by Korg in 1981, bridging the gap between monophonic and polyphonic synthesis. Released in the same year as the Korg Polysix, as a complementary synth, The Mono/Poly is equipped with four VCOs and can operate as a four-voice paraphonic synth with limited capabilities, or as a monophonic synth using all four oscillators. Upon its release, it was the only monophonic synthesizer with an integrated quad-VCO design available on the market.

== Sounds and features ==
The Mono/Poly features four voltage-controlled oscillators, each providing the same functions and offering four waveforms: triangle, sawtooth, pulse, and pulse width modulation. Every VCO can be individually adjusted for octave, volume, and detuning in relation to VCO 1, which has a Master Tuning feature instead. Only the fixed pulse width and the amount of pulse width modulation are shared settings across all VCOs. The Mono/Poly features a 4-pole resonant lowpass filter known for its strong, unique sound, with ADSR envelopes modulating both the VCF and VCA.

The Mono/Poly is equipped with two LFOs, named Modulation Generators; the first offers four waveforms and can target multiple parameters via the modulation wheel, while the second, a triangle wave, is dedicated to pulse width modulation and setting the Arpeggiator tempo. The Mono/Poly also features oscillator sync and cross modulation, labelled "Effects", allowing for various configurations such as one oscillator influencing the remaining three for mono play, or duophonic play with two pairs of oscillators modulating each other. The depth of these modulations can be adjusted using the filter envelope or the first Modulation Generator.

The Mono/Poly's Key Assign mode determines how the keyboard interacts with the VCOs, enabling various performance styles. In Unison mode, it functions as a standard analog mono synth. Poly mode allows for polyphonic play of up to four notes, assigning one VCO to each note with the possibility of different timbres for each note. Chord Memory mode enables monophonic play based on a pre-set chord voicing, assigning each VCO to a different note of the chord. Lastly, Unison/Share mode allocates oscillators to the current notes being played, balancing them across the voices.

The Mono/Poly features an Arpeggiator that offers latch, octave range, and note order settings. This can be combined with the Key Assign modes to create a wide range of effects including unison arpeggios and chordal arpeggios. In Poly mode, the Mono/Poly's four VCOs trigger sequentially, allowing the user to adjust each VCO's waveform, octave, and volume to transform simple patterns into unpredictable and dynamic sequences.

== Software ==
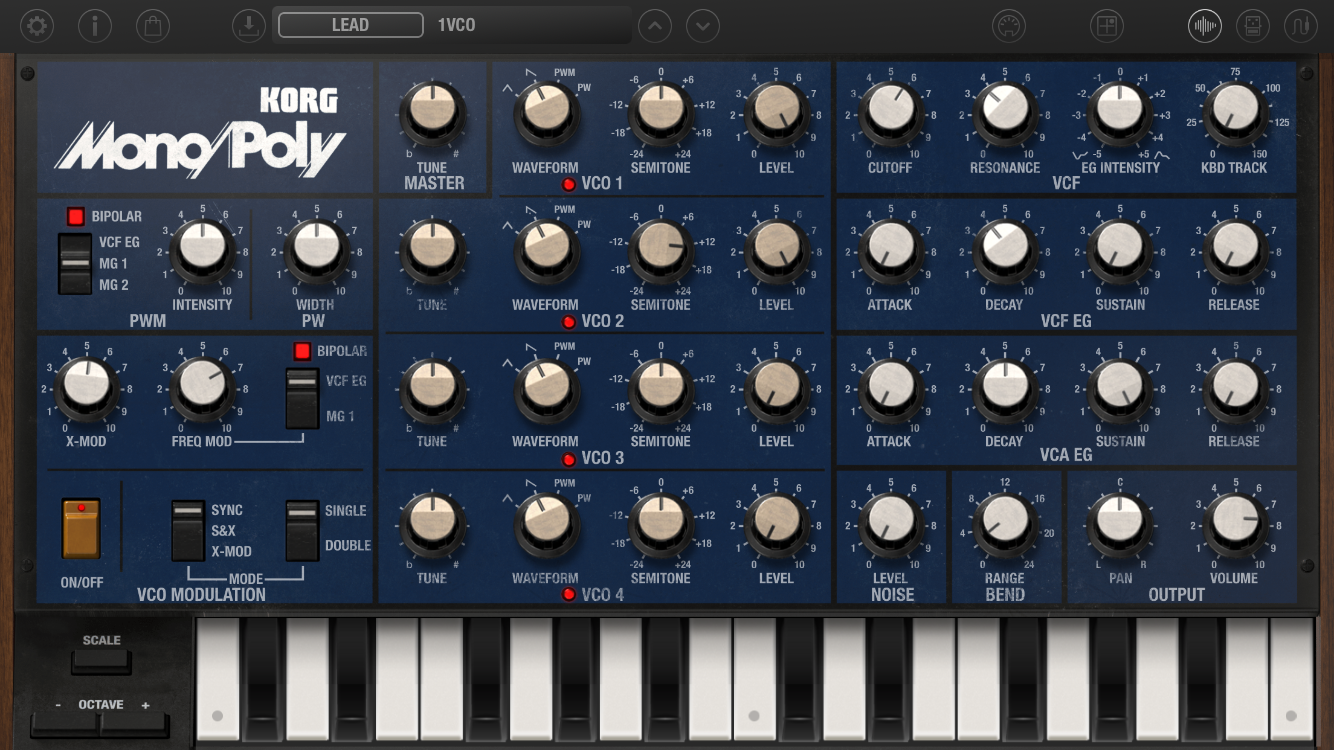
Korg iMono/Poly synthesizer for the iPhone

In 2007, Korg released a software emulator of the Mono/Poly as part of the Korg Legacy Collection, which offers a digital emulation of the Mono/Poly with modern features like MIDI compatibility and additional controls. In 2017, Korg introduced a mobile iOS application for iPad called iMono/Poly, which emulates the original synthesizer with additional features including effects and eight modulation patches.
