= Korg Collection =

VST instruments

The Korg Collection (initially launched as the Korg Legacy Collection in 2004) is a suite of virtual instruments and effects that emulate Korg's various hardware synthesizers. The original release included virtual versions of the MS-20, Polysix and Wavestation. Subsequent additions have expanded the collection to feature emulations of the Mono/Poly, M1, ARP Odyssey, Triton, miniKORG 700S, Prophecy, microKORG, PS-3300, Trinity, Vox Continental, ARP2600, and both the EP1 and SGX2 Sound Engines originally featured on the Korg Kronos. These plugins utilize Korg's Component Modeling Technology (CMT) to simulate the analog characteristics of the original instruments. The collection is compatible with VST, AU, and AAX plugin formats and includes standalone versions for use outside a digital audio workstation (DAW).

== History ==
=== Korg Legacy Collection (2004) ===
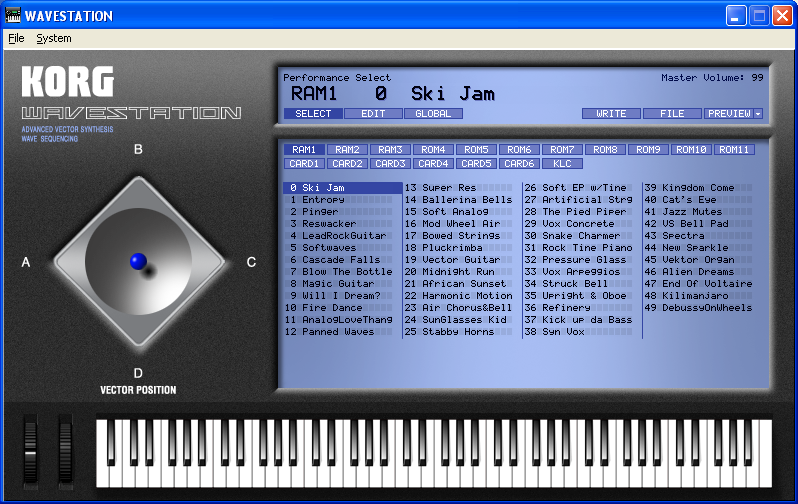
Korg Wavestation plugin

Launched in 2004, the initial Korg Legacy Collection featured emulations of the MS-20, Polysix, and Wavestation, along with a combination module named Legacy Cell, which integrates the MS20 and Polysix. The MS-20 plugin upgrades the original's monophonic capabilities to 32-voice polyphony, uses virtual patch cables and features MIDI-controllable knobs. The Polysix plug upgrades the original 6-voice polyphony to 32 voices, with added functionalities like MIDI clock synchronization for the LFO and arpeggiator. The Wavestation plugin offers sample rates from 44.1 kHz to 96 kHz, enhancing the original's 32 kHz rate, and comes with 550 presets. The original Legacy Collection also included MS-20iC, a USB controller designed for the MS-20 software that mirrors the appearance of the original MS-20, providing MIDI control and simulated patch cable manipulation.

Korg introduced the Legacy Collection Digital Edition in 2006, pairing the Wavestation plugin with a newly emulated Korg M1 plugin. The M1 plugin features 8-part multitimbrality, a maximum of 256-note polyphony, and includes presets from all 19 optional ROM cards. A free update added the entire preset collection from the T-series workstations to the M1 plugin.

Korg launched the Legacy Collection Analogue Edition in 2007, which combined the MS20 and Polysix plugins with a new emulation of the Mono/Poly. This new Mono/Poly plugin features eight virtual patches for enhanced modulation possibilities and increased polyphony of 128 voices.

=== Korg Collection (2017) ===
In December 2017, Korg renamed the Legacy Collection series to the Korg Collection and added an emulation of the Arp Odyssey, which followed the physical hardware reissue of the ARP Odyssey in 2015 with help from David Friend, co-founder of ARP Instruments.

=== Korg Collection 2 (2020) ===
In April 2020, Korg introduced the Collection 2, which provided updates to the previous plugins including scalable user interfaces and modern, high-definition graphics. These enhancements were provided free to existing users. The release also debuted an emulation of the Korg Triton, offering all 4,000 PCM-based presets, encompassing most sounds from Korg’s eight PCM Expansion boards. This version enhanced the polyphony to 256 voices but omitted the sampler, sequencer, and the capability to run a MOSS engine found in the original instrument.

=== Korg Collection 3 (2021) ===
In July 2021, Korg released the Korg Collection 3, adding three new software emulations to its lineup. This update featured an emulation of the miniKORG 700S, which added an arpeggiator, an eight-slot modulation matrix, and a six-effect virtual stompbox pedalboard. An emulation of the Prophecy upgraded the original monophonic limitation to support 256-voice polyphony and allowed for the import of Prophecy presets through sysex files. Additionally, a Korg Triton Extreme plugin was introduced, incorporating the valve amplifier effect from the original instrument.

=== Korg Collection 4 (2022) ===
The Korg Collection 4, launched in November 2022, featured a microKORG emulation that included the original's vocoder effect. This update also introduced a software drum machine Electribe-R, inspired by the Electribe-R series iElectribe for iPad, but with enhanced beat modes and the integration of effects and step sequencing capabilities from the original Electribe-R hardware and its mkII iteration. Additionally, a new Kaoss Pad effect was added, offering insights into its intricate internal architecture while maintaining the intuitive pad control interface.

=== Korg Collection 5 (2024) ===
On July 19, 2024, Korg released the Korg Collection 5, expanding its software suite with three new additions: the ARP 2600, EP-1 electric piano, and Vox Super Continental organ. This latest update includes the semi-modular ARP 2600 synthesizer, renowned for its distinct sounds and now featuring both classic modifications and entirely new modules. The EP-1 electric piano engine introduces seven models previously part of the KRONOS series, while the Vox Super Continental offers a digital version of the combo organ. Notably, the ARP 2600 joins the ARP Odyssey in the collection, marking continued collaboration with ARP Instruments co-founder David Friend.

=== Korg Collection 6 (2025) ===
On October 28, 2025, Korg released the Korg Collection 6, which include VST Versions of the Korg Trinity, Korg PS-3300 and the SGX2 Piano module from the Kronos.
