= Korg Poly-61 =

Analogue polyphonic synthesizer

Poly-61
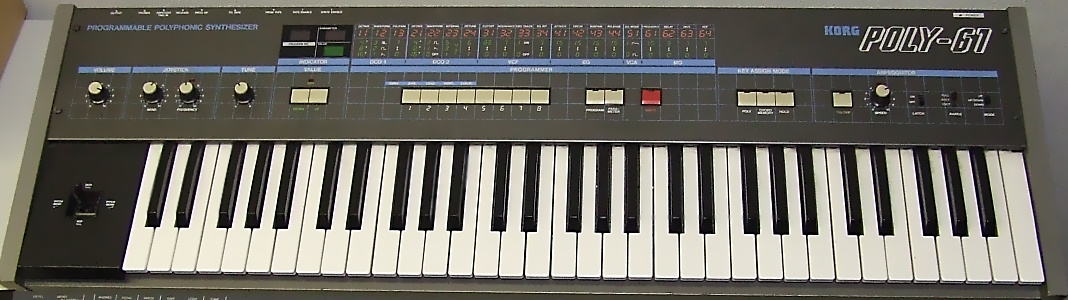
- Poly-61
- Manufacturer: Korg (Keio Electronic Laboratories)
- Dates: 1982-1986

Technical specifications
- Polyphony: 6 voices
- Timbrality: Monotimbral
- Oscillator: 2 DCOs per voice
- LFO: 1/2
- Synthesis type: Analog Subtractive
- Filter: 1 low-pass per voice
- Attenuator: 1 VCA per voice 1 ADSR envelope per voice
- Storage memory: 64 patches

Input/output
- Keyboard: 61 keys
- External control: Poly-61M has MIDI

The Korg Poly-61 (PS-61) is an analog synthesizer manufactured by Korg between 1982 and 1986. It was the first affordable synthesizer to feature two oscillators per voice, and was Korg's first synthesizer to feature digitally-controlled analog oscillators (DCOs). The Poly-61 marked a significant departure in design philosophy from previous Korg synthesizers by replacing the traditional array of dedicated control knobs on the front panel with a digital interface that required users to select parameters individually for adjustment.

In 1984, an updated version, the Poly-61M, was released to incorporate support for the newly established Musical Instrument Digital Interface (MIDI) standard.

== Background ==
The Poly-61 was launched as a successor to the Polysix and was developed in response to the competitive market of affordable polysynths dominated by Roland with its Juno-6. The Poly-61 distinguished itself by offering 64 programmable memories, surpassing the Juno-6, which had no memory storage. It also featured two banks of oscillators, allowing for interval and detuning effects, an enhancement over the Juno’s single oscillator bank. Despite Roland’s subsequent release of the Juno-60, which included 56 memory locations, it still only featured a single oscillator bank.

== Sounds and features ==
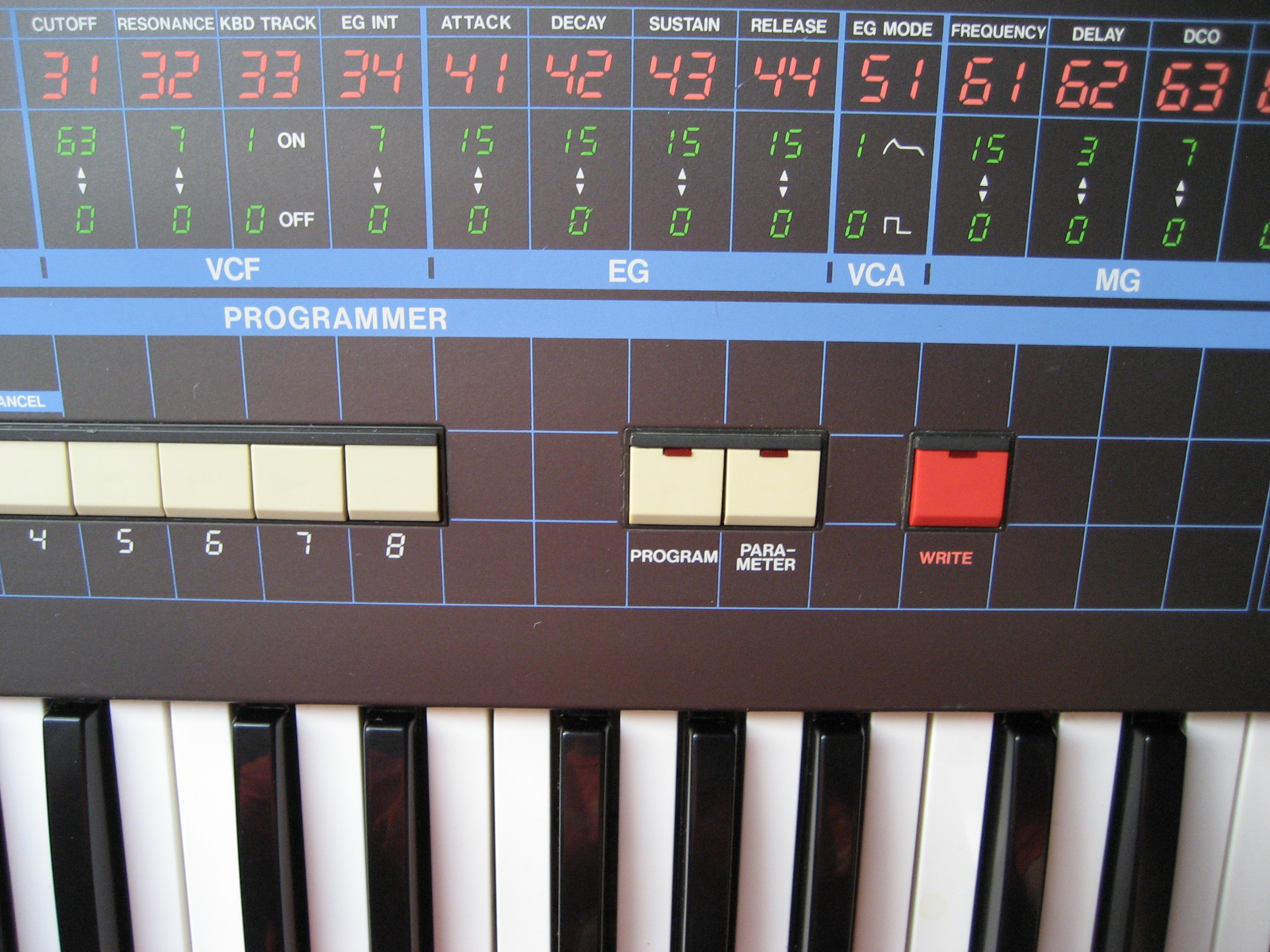
The Poly-61's digital control interface.

The Poly-61 features two digitally controlled analog oscillators (DCOs) per voice. DCO1 delivers sawtooth, square, and pulse-width modulation (PWM) waveforms. DCO2 generates sawtooth and square waveforms and can be slightly detuned from DCO1, or by specific musical intervals such as a third, fourth, minor third, or fifth. The voltage-controlled filter (VCF) includes standard controls for cutoff frequency, resonance, keyboard tracking, and envelope modulation. The settings are limited, offering a simple on/off for keyboard tracking and just eight options for resonance and envelope intensity.

The audio signal path passes through a voltage-controlled amplifier (VCA), which can controlled via an ADSR envelope generator or an external CV/gate pulse. The synthesizer's low-frequency oscillator (LFO) produces a triangle wave, featuring a variable delay, and can modulate both the DCOs and the VCF. A modulation joystick allows for pitch bending when moved from left to right and vibrato from an additional independent LFO when moved back and forth. The Poly-61 was one of the first Korg synthesizers to feature the company's famous 4-way joystick, which offered pitch bend and modulation control, which has remained a synonymous feature of Korg keyboards right up to the present day.

The Poly-61 also features an arpeggiator; a chord memory function capable of capturing up to six notes, enabling them to be played back from a single key with accurate transposition; and a hold switch to sustain notes after the keys have been released. It can be set to monophonic mode by using the poly and hold switches together, which allows for all 12 oscillators to play a single note.

== Reception ==
The Poly-61 was not as well received as the Polysix, with criticism levelled to its push-button programming interface, the perceived lack of warmth from its digitally-controlled oscillators (DCOs) compared to the Polysix's voltage-controlled oscillators (VCOs), and the coarsely quantised resolution of the digital programming system. The Poly-61 also lacked the on-board effects of the Polysix.

The Poly-61 was released just before the introduction of MIDI, and still used old style analog voltage trigger outputs to interface it with sequencers and drum machines (although this was addressed by the later addition of MIDI in the Poly-61M). However, it would be the release of the all-digital Yamaha DX7 just a few months after the Poly-61 that would quickly erode its market appeal. The Poly-61 was replaced in 1985 by the DW-8000 which still used a partially analog architecture. It was not until the Korg M1 six years later, that Korg returned to the top of the class with one of the first sample-based digital workstation synths.
