= Korg DW-6000 =

Analogue synthesizer

DW-6000
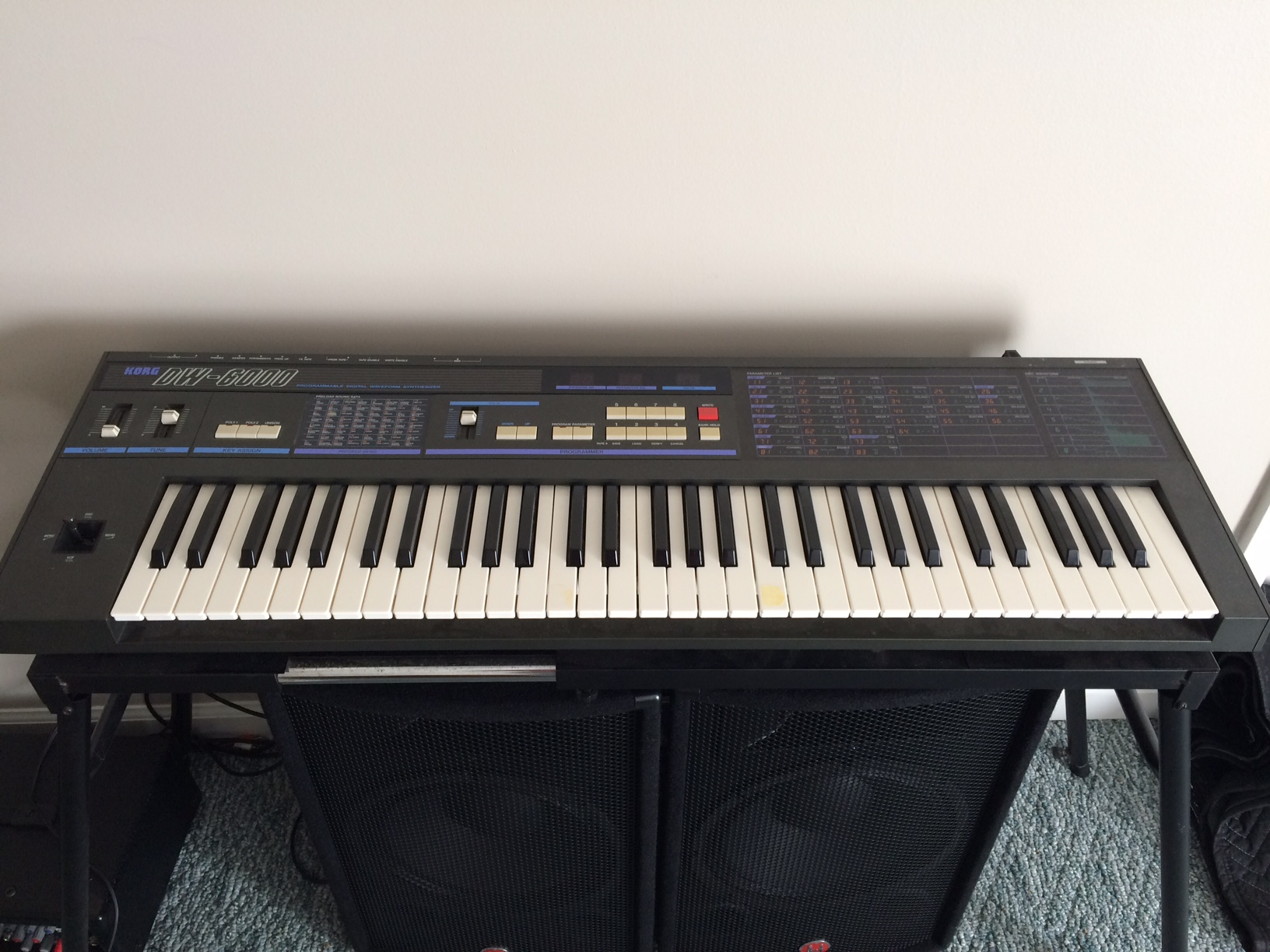
- Manufacturer: Korg
- Dates: 1985

Technical specifications
- Polyphony: 6
- Timbrality: 1
- Oscillator: 2 DWGS waveforms per voice
- LFO: 1
- Synthesis type: Analog/digital hybrid using subtractive synthesis
- Filter: 4-pole resonant low-pass
- Attenuator: ADBSSR envelope generator
- Aftertouch expression: no
- Velocity expression: no
- Storage memory: 64
- Effects: Chorus

Input/output
- Keyboard: 61-key
- Left-hand control: Joystick
- External control: MIDI

The Korg DW-6000 is a six-voice polyphonic hybrid digital-analog synthesizer released in 1985. It blends digital waveforms with analog filters and amplifiers, and has a chorus effect to create a richer sound. The DW-6000 was quickly succeeded by the DW-8000.

== Sounds and features ==
The DW-6000 is a six-voice hybrid digital-analog synthesizer with a five-octave keyboard, memory for 64 presets, a joystick and MIDI implementation. The front panel has two buttons for program and parameter selection, numeric keys for choosing program and parameter numbers, and a data slider with +/— buttons for more precise parameter editing, echoing the design used on the Korg Poly-61, Korg's first synthesizer with digital controls.

The DW-6000 uses Korg's Digital Waveform Generator System (DWGS), which has sampled waveforms stored in a pair of 256 Kbit ROM chips. Eight digital waveforms are available, whose harmonic spectra are graphically represented on the front panel. A single waveform sample is used for each octave, which were then stored on ROM chips. The DW-6000 has two oscillators per voice, with controls to modify their relative volumes and detune the second oscillator, creating a rich chorus-like effect.

The key assign modes allow standard polyphonic playing as well as and polyphonic portamento. In Unison mode, all six dual-oscillator voices of the synth converge on a single note and are automatically detuned. The DW-6000's voltage-controlled amplifier (VCA) and voltage-controlled filter (VCF) are analog, which contributes to its rich sound. Both the VCA and VCF envelopes feature six-stage ''ADBSSR' envelopes featuring Attack, Decay, Break Point, Slope, Sustain and Release stages, allowing for complex envelope shapes to be created.The DW-6000 includes a programmable stereo chorus, providing two outputs, which helps create a more analog sound.

== Reception ==
Criticism of the DW-6000 focused on its lack of a touch-sensitive keyboard, a feature becoming standard by the end of 1985, the single parameter control which slowed down editing, and the absence of RAM cartridge storage. However, it received praise for its sound quality, especially its piano sounds, brass effects, and metallic and bell-like digital sounds, which were reminiscent of the pricier PPG Wave.

The DW-6000 initially faced challenges due to its high recommended retail price of around £1,200, which was quickly adjusted to £999 to stay competitive. The announcement of the upcoming DW-8000, which featured a velocity-sensitive keyboard, impacted its sales negatively. The subsequent release of the DW-8000 eclipsed the DW-6000, as the new model introduced velocity and pressure sensitivity, 16 waveshapes, a sophisticated arpeggiator, and a programmable digital delay line for each sound, all at a similar price point of approximately £1200.
