= Electribe =

Group of synthesizers

Electribe is a group of electronic musical instruments by Korg. From its beginnings with the Electribe R to the ESX-1, this series includes both analogue modeling synthesizers and sampling drum machines that can be programmed the same as a drum machine. The analogue modeling synth and sampling drum machine both share a drum-pattern section and a synth-pattern section, whereby the user can not only program drum patterns, but also synth and basslines. These hybrid machines could be considered 'grooveboxes'.

The launch party for the product in 1999 was announced with a recorded CD (Compact Disk) invitation that was featured in Entertainment Weekly magazine as one of the best party invitations of the year.

== Models ==
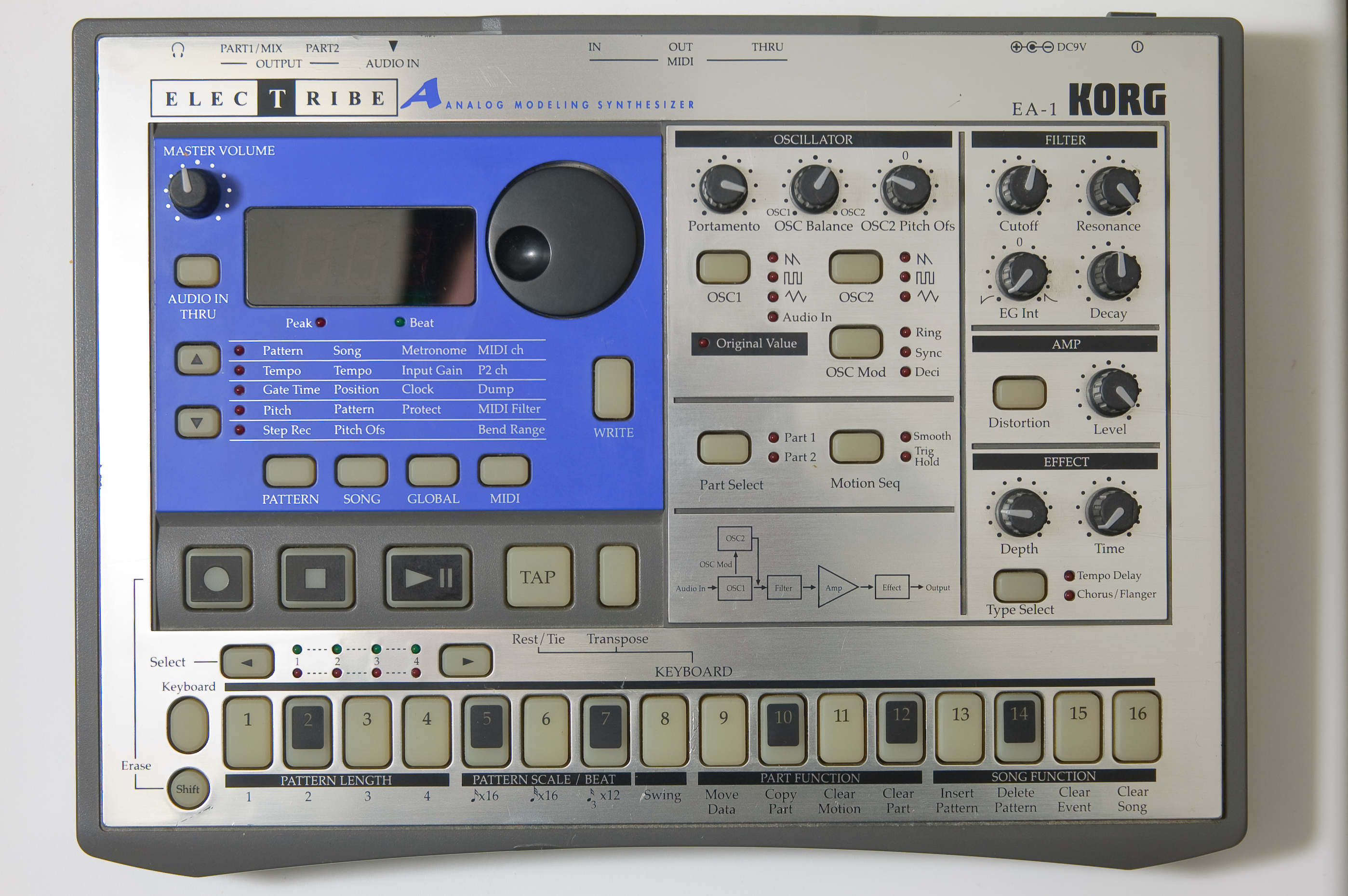
Electribe A (EA-1)

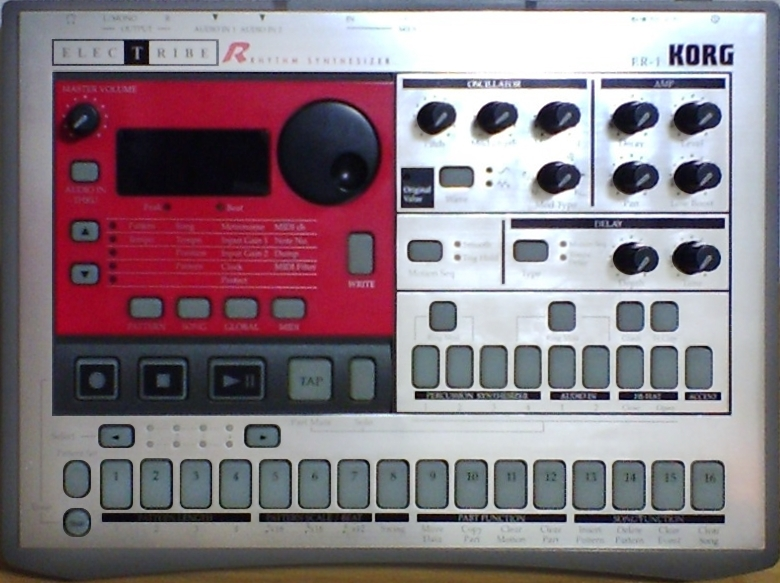
Electribe R (ER-1)

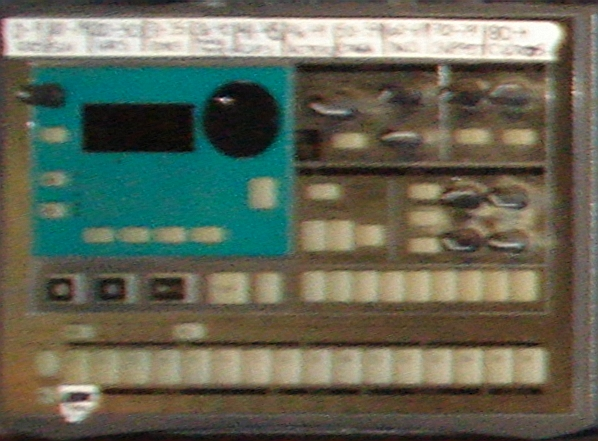
Electribe S (ES-1)

=== 1st generation (1999–2000) ===
- Korg EA-1: Analog Modeling Synthesizer

- Korg Electribe R1: Rhythm Synthesizer
- Korg ES-1: Rhythm Production Sampler
- EM-1: Music Production Station

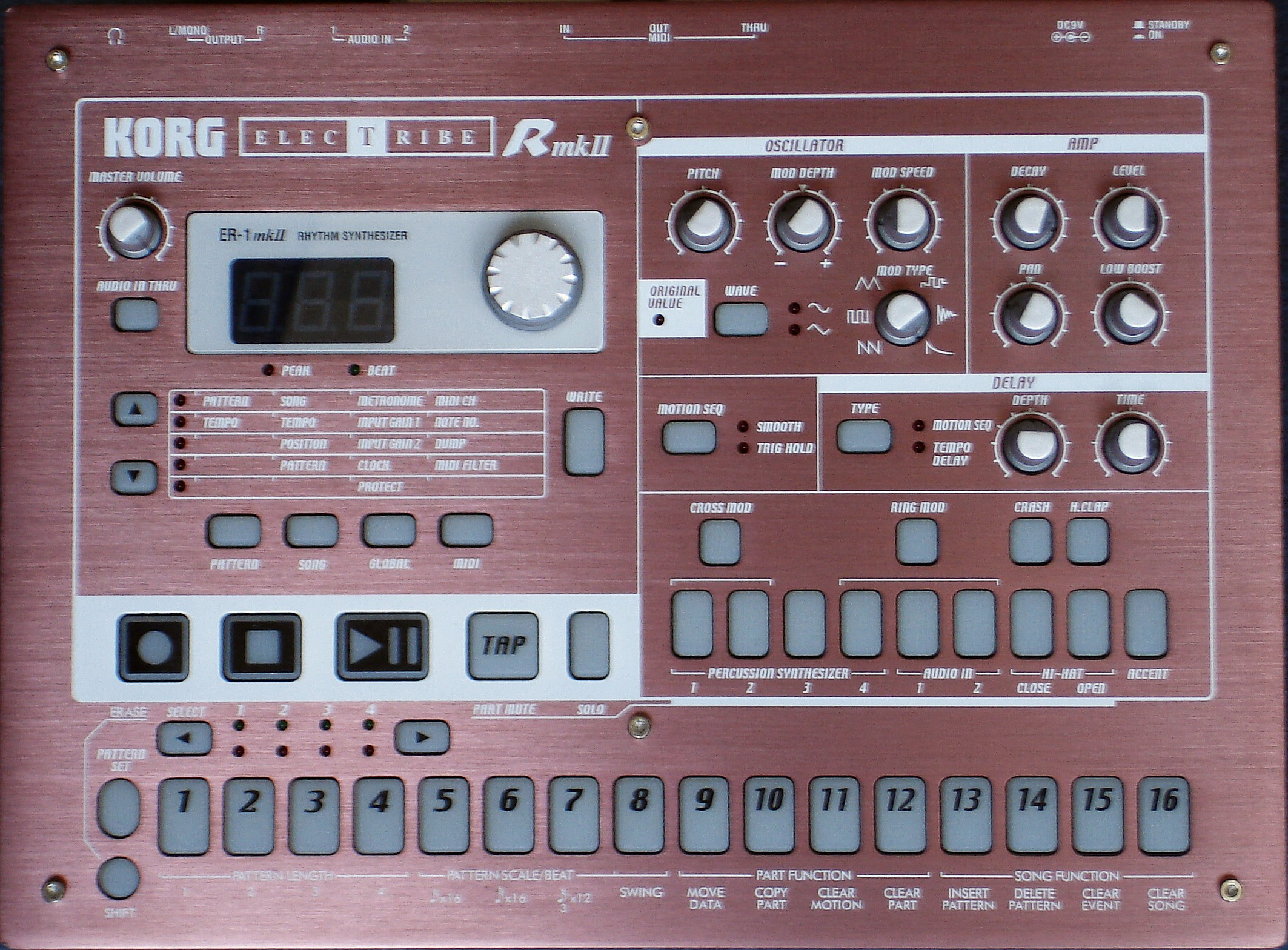
Electribe R mkII

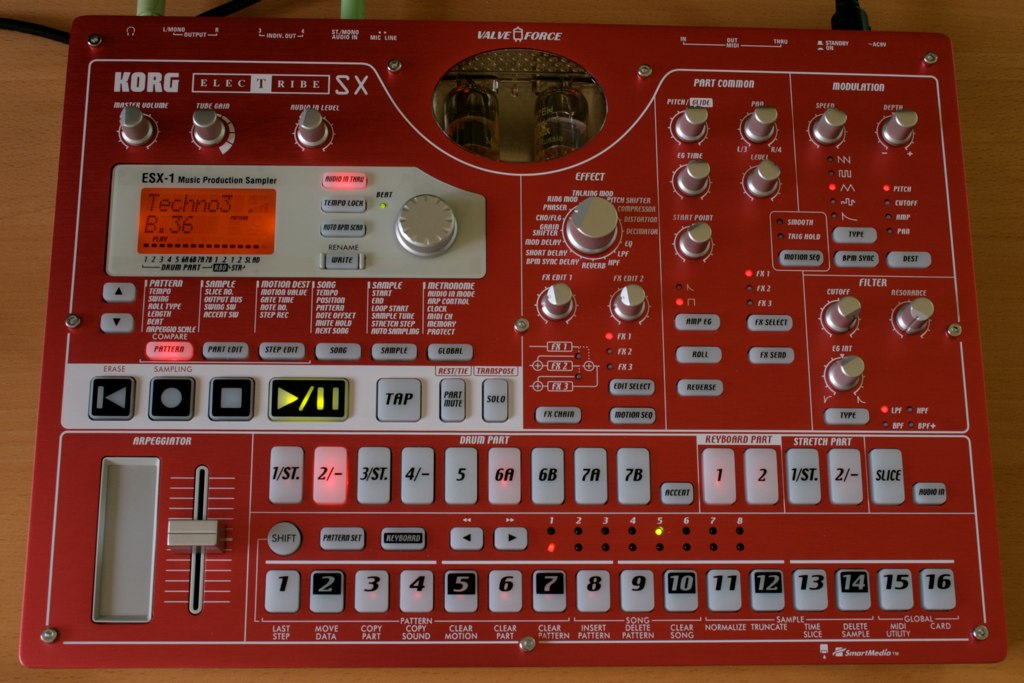
Electribe SX (ESX-1)

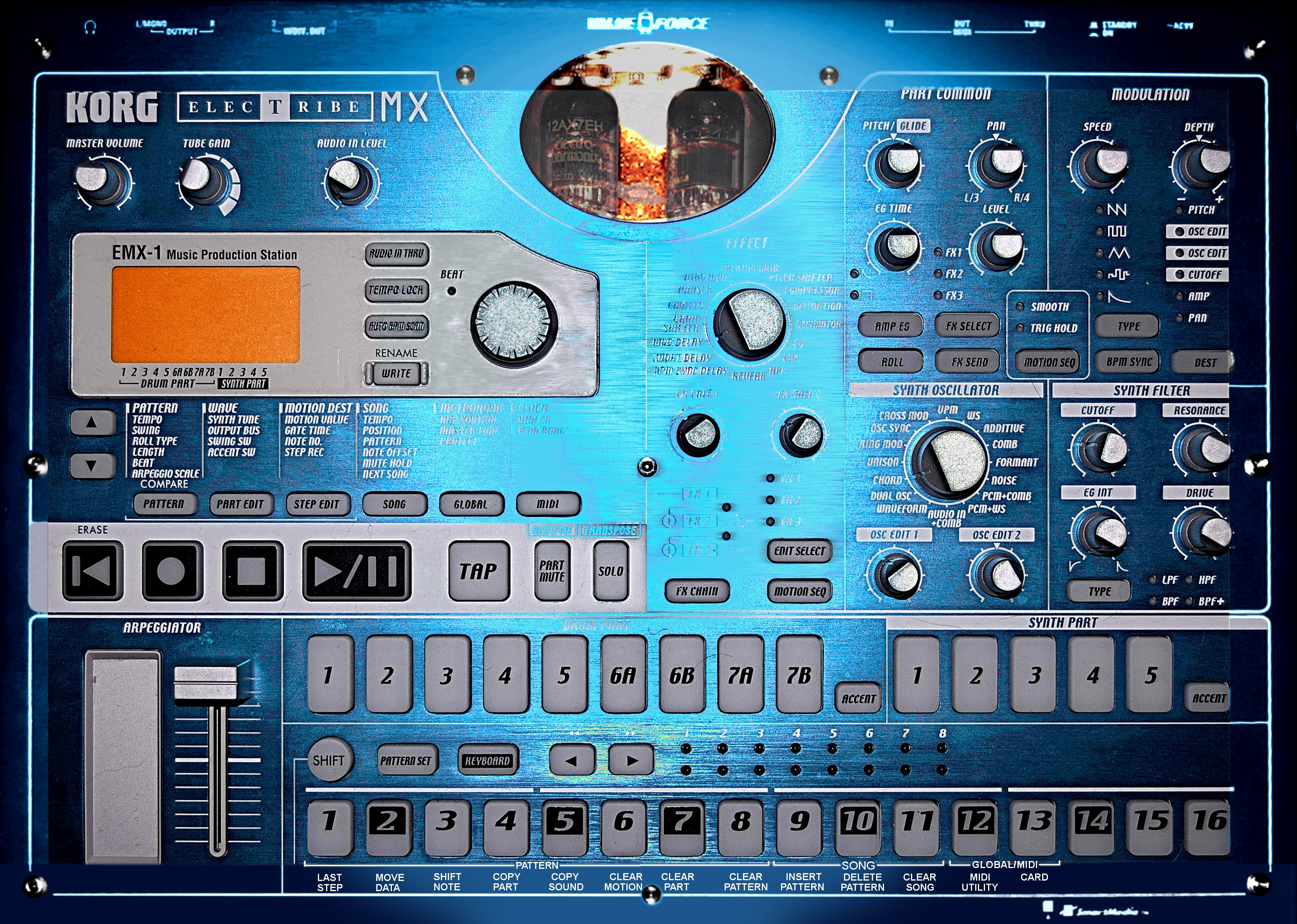
Electribe MX (EMX-1)

=== 2nd generation (2003–2004) ===
- EA-1 mkII: Analog Modeling Synthesizer
- ER-1 mkII: Rhythm Synthesizer
- ES-1 mkII: Rhythm Production Sampler (using SmartMedia storage. Maximum size card recognized is 64MB)
- ESX-1: Music Production Sampler (using SmartMedia storage)
- EMX-1: Music Production Station (using SmartMedia storage)

=== 3rd generation (2010) ===
- ESX-1SD: Music Production Sampler (Identical to the ESX-1, but using Secure Digital (SD) storage)
- EMX-1SD: Music Production Station (Identical to the EMX-1, but using Secure Digital (SD) storage)

iElectribe for iPad

=== iPad application ===
- iElectribe: an app for the iPad
- iElectribe: an app for the iPhone
- Electribe Wave: an app for the iPad and iPhone

=== 4th generation (announced September 2014) ===
- electribe: Music Production Station (using SD Card storage)
- electribe sampler: Music Production Sampler (using SD Card storage)
- Electribe ER1 VST, as part of the Korg Collection released in November 2022.
