= Korg Polyphonic Ensemble P =

Synthesizer

Korg Polyphonic Ensemble PE-1000
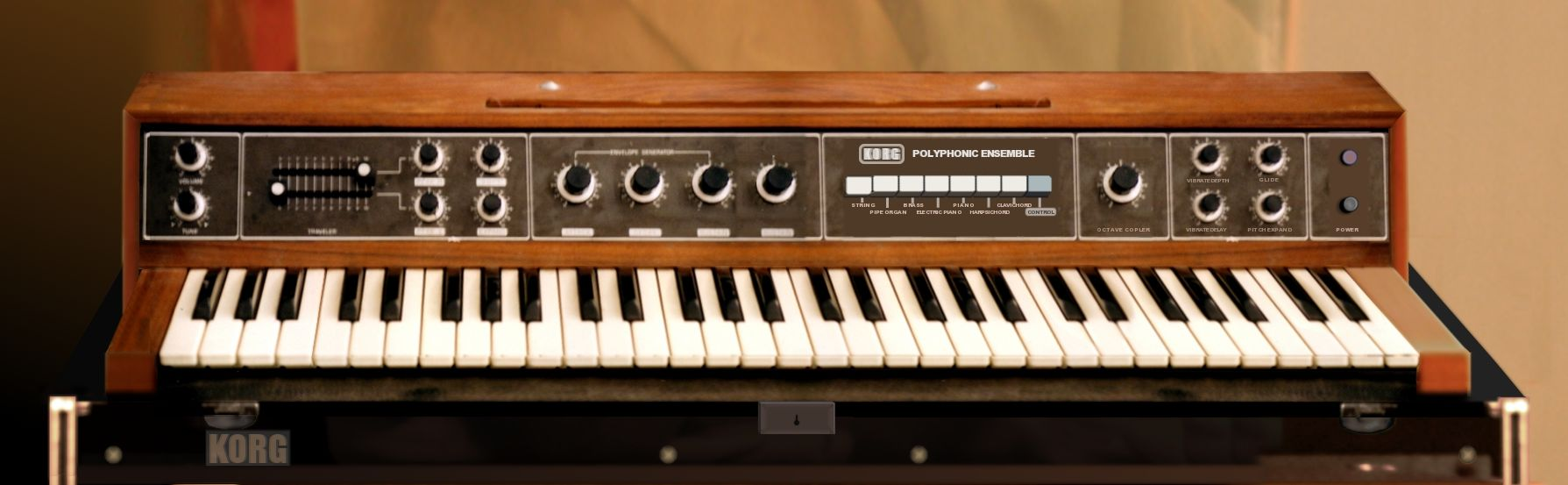
- Korg PE-1000
- Manufacturer: Korg
- Dates: 1976 - 1979

Technical specifications
- Polyphony: Full
- Timbrality: 1
- Oscillator: 1 VCO per note
- LFO: None
- Synthesis type: Subtractive synthesis
- Filter: 1 low pass, 1 high pass
- Attenuator: 1 attack and sustain
- Aftertouch expression: no
- Velocity expression: no
- Storage memory: None

Input/output
- Keyboard: 61 Keys
- Left-hand control: Traveler Expression, Damper pedal control, Glide pedal control
- External control: 1/4" Phone Jack, Mono Out

The Korg PE-1000 (Polyphonic Ensemble) is a preset-based polyphonic analog synthesizer released by Korg in 1976. It was Korg's first polyphonic synthesizer and was marketed in the US as the Univox K4.

== Background ==
In the mid-1970s, polyphonic synthesizers had started to emerge, with the releases of the Yamaha GX-1, Oberheim Four Voice, and Polymoog signalling a new direction in synthesis technology. Korg aiming to produce a synthesizer capable of producing true polyphonic chords, as all of their previous synthesizers had been monophonic.

Constructing a polyphonic synth was prohibitively expensive at the time. Although string synthesizers had been available for a few years, they didn't offer the articulation of a true synthesizer. Korg's innovation involved integrating the basic features of a monosynth with the polyphonic sound generation system of string synthesizers, resulting in the release of two Polyphonic Ensemble keyboards. These instruments, the PE-1000 followed by the PE-2000, offered limited controls and primarily relied on preset sounds.

== PE-1000 ==
The PE-1000 generates electric piano sounds through seven distinct presets, each defined by settings of the 'Traveler' filter first featured on the miniKORG 700 as well as an envelope generator. Although some control over the sound is possible, it operates with a single filter and envelope across all voices and lacks touch sensitivity.

== PE-2000 ==
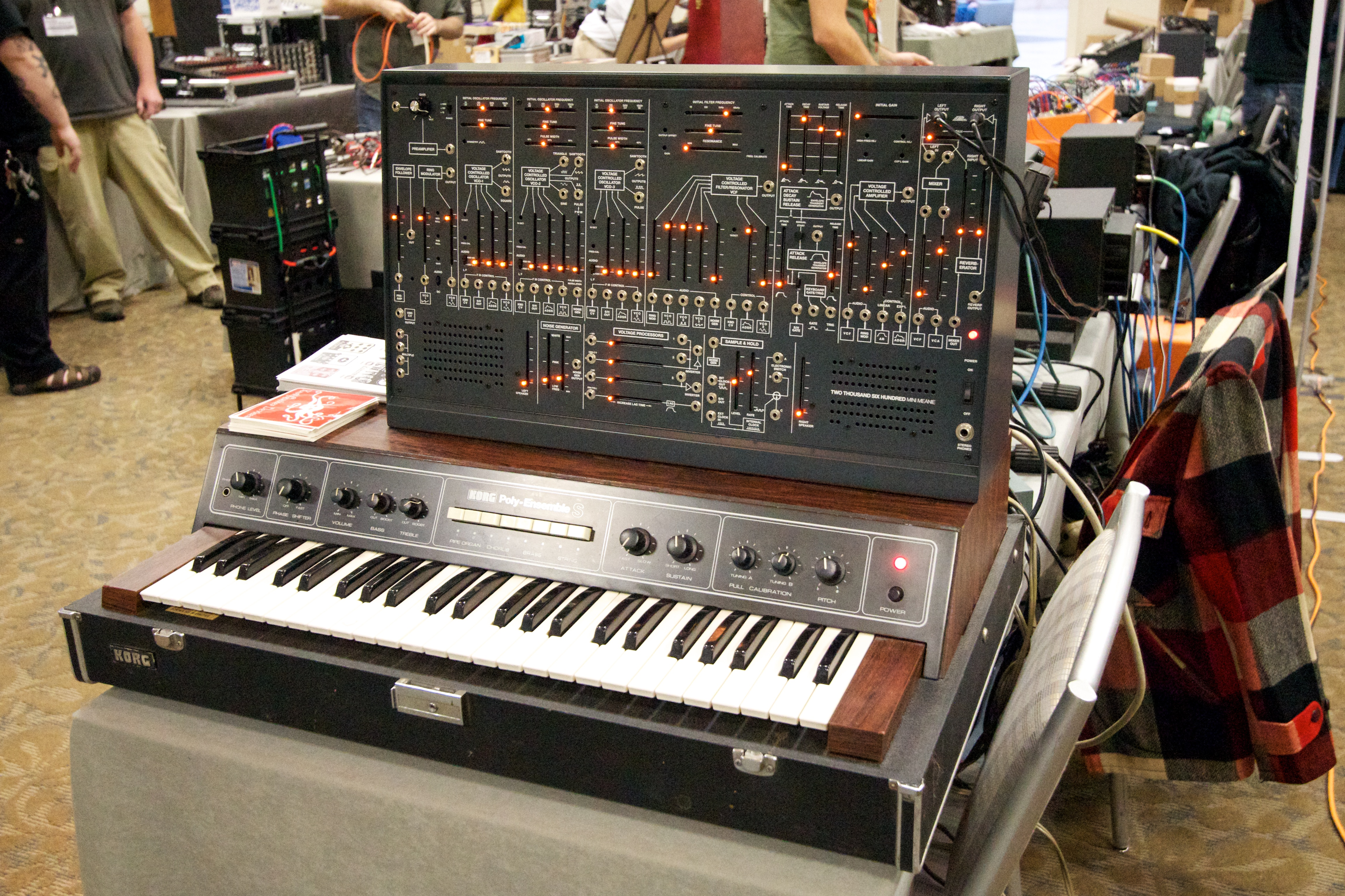
Korg PE-2000 underneath an ARP 2600 clone.

The PE-2000 (Polyphonic Ensemble S) is a string synthesizer, creating a richer sound than the PE-1000 through the use of three detunable divide-down generators with individual modulation oscillators, and a built-in phaser effect. It includes eight presets, such as organ, brass, chorus, and string sounds, and was utilized by notable artists like Vangelis, Tangerine Dream, Jean-Michel Jarre, Kansas and Hawkwind.
