= Six Missing (musician) =

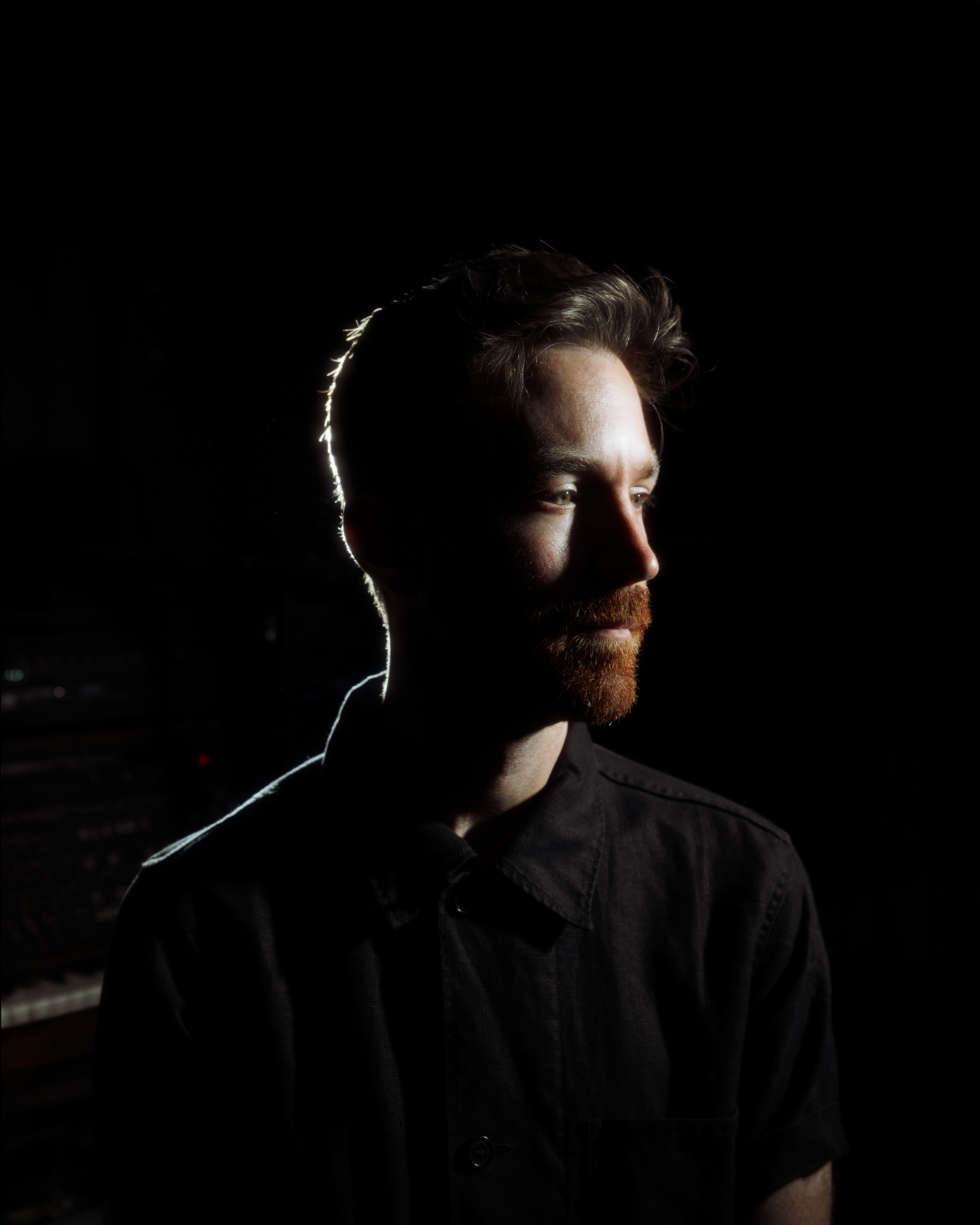

Background information
- Born: TJ Dumser
- Genre: Ambient Music
- Occupations: Ambient music producer; composer
- Instruments: Guitar synthesizer; keyboards
- Years active: 2017–present
- Labels: Mystery Circles, Nettwerk Music Group; Sea Level Sounds; Slow Echo; Sound Meditation
- Website: sixmissing.com

Six Missing is the ambient music project of Austin-based composer and sound designer TJ Dumser. Created in 2017, Six Missing is known for creating meditative soundscapes.

The name is a tribute to the six missing American Revolutionary War's soldiers who were not accounted for during the American Revolutionary War’s Battle of Brandywine. Dumser had been working at a recording near the site, and experienced a supernatural phenomenon.

== Artist history ==
Dumser came into ambient music as a commuter, when he was traveling to work from Westchester County into Manhattan. He told Clotmag that the music became “the underscore for the world and landscape whipping by my window of the Metro-North Hudson Line. I loved how the soundtracks and sonic journey would sculpt my experience. It added drama to an otherwise mundane experience.”

In 2017, Dumser began uploading loops of ambient music. At the time, Dumser was working full-time as a senior sound designer in New York City. Upon quitting his day job, he began to devote himself full-time to creating music while paying the bills as a freelance sound designer. He told PLAYY.magazine that his approach to music is personal. “I decided to take my anxiety and depression, that I deal with, and transmute them into light and art, helping myself feel better and hopefully helping others feel better in the process."

In 2021, Six Missing released the EP Patricia on Inner Ocean Records. He wrote on the liner notes that this was a tribute to Dumser's maternal grandmother who died the previous year. That same year, Six Missing collaborated with IDRA on the Wildflowers EP. Dumser recorded those tracks as well as the tracks on Patricia at Cabin in the Woods Music in Austin, Texas.

On New Year's Day of 2022, Six Missing released a four-track EP called Intention. Later the same year, Six Missing released the follow-up EP, Intention II, via Sea Level Sounds imprint. Clash Music called it an “expression of ambience.”

Six Missing signed with Nettwerk Music Group and made his debut with the label, releasing in 2023, Here For Now. On Here For Now, Six Missing used a Korg PS-3100, a polyphonic analog synthesizer, and a Minimoog Model D.

On the November 2024 episode of Jamie Lidell’s Hanging Out with Audiophiles, Dumser discussed his approach to creating music as well as his collab with Clariloops and Jamie Lidell for the single "Sitting Beachside (feat. Clariloops & Jamie Lidell) Remix" on Six Missing's counter:point EP. Dumser also did a remix of “Sitting Beachside” with St. Lucia. He said so much of it was the “journey of experimentation.” Six Missing followed up the Clariloops collaboration with the EP Gentle Breath, which was a reaction in part to a mental health crisis, as Dumser told Igloo, he'd "run himself into the ground."

Six Missing collaborated with Kaitlyn Aurelia Smith on the remix of “A Nod Farewell” in 2024, and The Album Leaf the following year on the single, “Carousel.” Six Missing also collaborated with SUSS that year. On the podcast Ambient Country, Episode 44, called “Friends We Made Along The Road (SXSW) edition,” Dumser discussed how he enjoyed working with synths and “machines that you have no choice but to be patient with them,” and to “watch where this circus is going to go.”

In August 2025, Six Missing released the full-length Without Mind on the label Nettwerk. Built on Eurorack modular systems, a Moog Matriarch, and a Minimoog, Without Mind was conceived as a score for ketamine-assisted therapy sessions. For Mental Health Awareness Month, Six Missing's single “Effortless” was featured on Amazon Music Original x World Mental Health Day 2025. Dumser traveled back to New York City with his family to see it up on the Times Square billboard, telling the Yorktown News how that moment was a “New Yorker's dream come true.”

In January 2026, Six Missing worked with Swedish composer Patrik Berg Almkvisth on Developments, a seven-part collection of ambient movements. They utilized Moog synths, guitars, bass, piano, and vintage tape textures and mixed in Dolby Atmos. Six Missing released 2026's drift,sway LP, using "MTL.ASMLY Count to Five, Meris Mercury 7, EarthQuaker Devices Avalanche Run, Analogman King of Tone, and Boomerang Looper."

== Gear ==
Six Missing mixes in Dolby Atmos. Dumser's studio has a variety of equipment, such as a Moog Matriarch, a Moog Memorymoog, a vintage ’74 Minimoog Model D, Eurorack modular setup with modules from Make Noise Music, Mutable Instruments, Strymon, and 4ms Company. Dumser is a guitarist, synthesist, and sound designer and has effect pedals ranging from Hologram Electronics, Earthquaker Devices, Chase Bliss Audio and Meris Mercury 7. Dumser's guitar collection includes a Fender Jazzmaster, a vintage ’64 Gretsch Clipper, and a ’65 Magnatone amp. In addition, he has a 1980s Omnichord, 2 Tascams (a 414 and 424), a Nagra IV-S, Soma Synths Lyra-8, and an Otari MX5050B-ii and Korg PS3100.

== Discography ==
| YEAR | TITLE | LABEL | FORMAT | REF |
|---|---|---|---|---|
| 2017 | Astoria | Nettwerk Music Group | LP | |
| | "Lighthouse on Mars" | Nettwerk Music Group | Single | |
| | Repeat | Nettwerk Music Group | LP | |
| 2018 | Chakobsa | Sea Level Sounds | EP | |
| 2019 | Better Now | Nettwerk Music Group | EP | |
| | Bachelorette | Nettwerk Music Group | EP | |
| | Without a Net | Nettwerk Music Group | EP | |
| | Live at Rockwood 3 | Nettwerk Music Group | Live Album | |
| 2020 | Vibration | Nettwerk Music Group | EP | |
| | Horsehead Nebula | Nettwerk Music Group | LP | |
| 2021 | Patricia | Inner Ocean Records | EP | |
| | Displaced | Sound Meditation | EP | |
| | Flutter | Sea Level Sounds | EP | |
| | Wildflowers | Mystery Circles | EP | |
| | Summer Folds | Nettwerk Music Group | LP | |
| 2022 | Intention | Nettwerk Music Group | EP | |
| | "When The Trees Sleep" | Sea Level Sounds | Single | |
| | Unfolding | Nettwerk Music Group | EP | |
| | Moods, Which | Nettwerk Music Group | EP | |
| | In Other Lifetimes... | Nettwerk Music Group | EP | |
| | set+setting | Slow Echo | EP | |
| | Intention II | Sea Level Sounds | EP | |
| 2023 | Here for Now | Nettwerk Music Group | EP | |
| 2024 | counter:point | Nettwerk Music Group | EP | |
| | Gentle Breath | Nettwerk Music Group | EP | |
| 2025 | Without Mind | Nettwerk Music Group | LP | |
| | "Effortless" | Nettwerk Music Group/Amazon Music | Single | |
| | Glowing From Within | Nettwerk Music Group | EP | |
| 2026 | Developments | Nettwerk Music Group | EP | |
| | drift, sway | Nettwork Music Group | LP | |
| | Passed Self | Nettwork Music Group | EP | |
