= Korg miniKORG 700 =

Monophonic analogue synthesizer

miniKORG 700
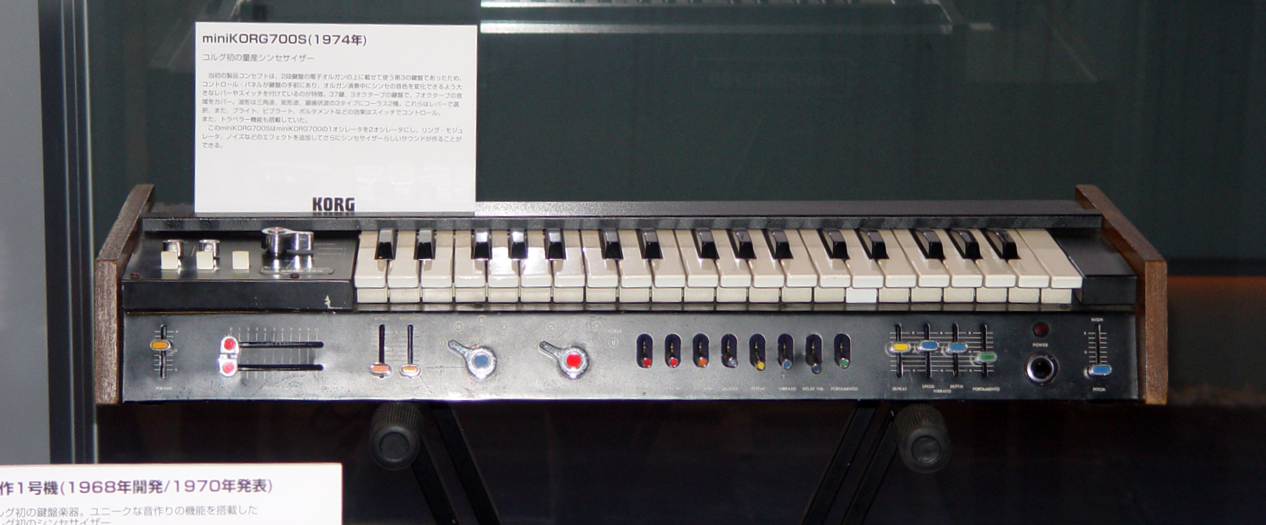
- miniKORG 700S on display at the Korg head office museum in Tokyo.
- Manufacturer: Korg
- Dates: 1973

Technical specifications
- Polyphony: Monophonic
- Timbrality: 1 part
- Oscillator: 1 VCO
- LFO: Yes
- Synthesis type: Analogue, subtractive
- Filter: high pass, low pass
- Attenuator: Attack, decay, release
- Aftertouch expression: no
- Velocity expression: no
- Storage memory: None
- Effects: portamento, auto-bender, vibrato, auto-repeat

Input/output
- Keyboard: 37 keys

The miniKORG 700 is a monophonic analog synthesizer released by Korg in 1973, marking their entry into mass-produced synthesizers and their first monophonic synthesizer. It was initially designed to be placed on top of an organ, so its controls are located below the keyboard facing towards the performer. An updated model, the miniKORG 700S, was launched in 1974, introducing a second oscillator that could be detuned, along with additional sustain and vibrato controls.

== Background ==
In the early 1970s, Korg, then known as Keio Giken Kogyo Inc. and recognized for its rhythm machines, started development of a new electric organ, led by engineer Fumio Mieda. This led to the creation of a dual-manual organ that was based on analog synthesis elements rather than traditional tonewheel or transistor organ technologies, and was briefly marketed in 1973 under the name Korg, from the words "Keio Organ".

Korg's owner, Tsutomu Katoh, recognized the potential of Mieda's organ prototype as a synthesizer in Japan's untapped market, which lacked any domestic synthesizer manufacturers at the time. This prototype was refined into the more compact, monophonic miniKORG 700, marketed in the USA by Univox as the Univox MiniKORG K-1. With a launch price of $995, the miniKORG was the first synthesizer to be priced below $1,000, setting it up as a competitive option against the ARP 2600, priced at $1,995, and the Minimoog, which cost $1,500.

== Sounds and features ==
The miniKORG 700 was designed with organists in mind and features a layout where controls are organized and spaced for tactile use. Controls are distinguished by colour coding, with loudness-related controls in orange, pitch controls in blue, tonal character in red, auto-retriggering in yellow and portamento in green.

The 700's oscillator provides five waveforms: sine, square, sawtooth, and two pulse-width modulation waveforms named Chorus I and II, which create rich, swirling sounds. Its envelope features an attack setting and a unique 'singing' control, which together serve as attack and decay stages from a traditional envelope generator. Additionally, a toggle labelled 'sustain' functions as a release control, with its duration set by the level of the singing control.

The 'Traveler' control combines dual 12dB/oct low-pass and high-pass filters, designed so the low-pass filter cannot surpass the high-pass, preventing a configuration that would result in silence. These filters were capable of producing a vocal-like sound. An 'expand' toggle controls the amount the envelope modulates the filter's cutoff frequency, and a 'bright' toggle adds a preset amount of filter resonance. Other features include 'bender' for a pitch glide effect from below to the played note, 'repeat' for performing trills, a vibrato with adjustable depth, rate, and delay, and variable-rate portamento for sliding between notes.

== miniKORG 700S ==
In 1974, Korg introduced the miniKORG 700S, an enhanced version of the original model with a secondary control panel named the 'Effects Section,' alongside an additional oscillator that could be tuned independently. The 700S also added white and pink noise generators, filter modulation termed 'travel vibrato', and a 'sustain long' option that greatly extended the envelope time. The effects section introduced three ring modulation modes, two of which followed the keyboard's notes for consistent timbres, while the third mode offered varied timbres for each key pressed. The 700S variant is the more recognized model to this day. The 700S was used in 1978 by Daniel Miller to record Warm Leatherette.

== Modern variants ==
In 2021, Korg released the miniKORG 700FS, a modern reissue designed in collaboration with Fumio Mieda, the original creator. The 700FS version maintains dual oscillators from the 700S version and introduces a spring reverb effect and a joystick for pitchbend and modulation. Other new features include aftertouch, an arpeggiator, USB port, MIDI IN, a CV/Gate In jack as well as a memory button for saving patches.

In 2022, Korg released a software emulator of the miniKORG 700S as part of their Korg Collection 3 plugin suite. The emulator offers enhanced performance controls, an arpeggiator, an extensive modulation matrix with new LFOs and ADSR generators, and a versatile effects board featuring six virtual stompbox effects.
