= Korg M1 =

Synthesizer

M1
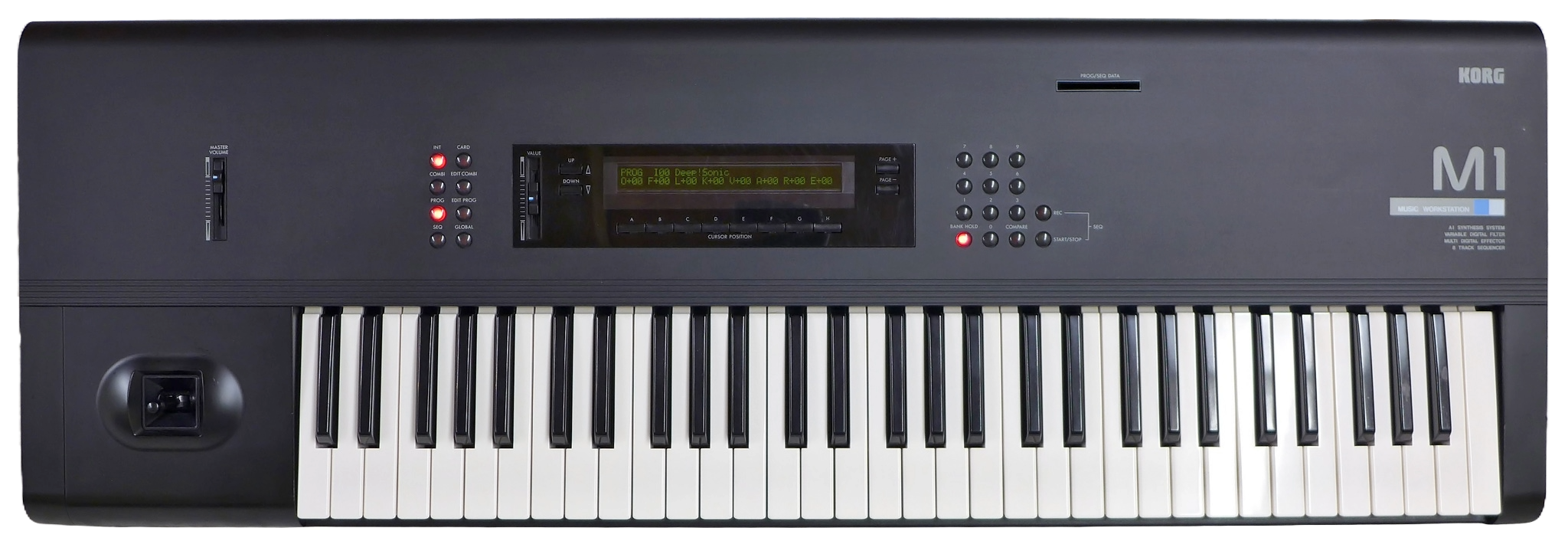
- The Korg M1
- Manufacturer: Korg
- Dates: 1988–1995
- Price: US$2,166 est. street (1988)/$2,749 MSRP (1990) £1,499 ¥248,000

Technical specifications
- Polyphony: 16 voices, 16 oscillators
- Timbrality: 8 part
- Oscillator: 16 oscillators, 16-bit 2 Mword (4 MB) PCM waveform ROM (100 multisounds + 44 drum sounds)
- Synthesis type: Digital sample-based subtractive
- Filter: VDF (variable digital filter), low-pass velocity-sensitive (non-resonant)
- Attenuator: 3 independent AADBSSRR envelope generators
- Aftertouch expression: Yes
- Velocity expression: Yes
- Storage memory: 100 programs / 100 combinations / 4400 sequencer notes or 50 programs / 50 combinations / 7700 sequencer notes depending on global settings, and 10 songs + 100 patterns
- Effects: Reverb, delay, phaser, tremolo, exciter, ensemble, overdrive, EQ, chorus, flanger, rotary speaker

Input/output
- Keyboard: 61 keys (Yamaha FS keybed)
- Left-hand control: Spring-return joystick (pitch and modulation)
- External control: MIDI IN/OUT/THRU

The Korg M1 is a synthesizer and music workstation manufactured by the Japanese company Korg from 1988 to 1995. It is one of the bestselling synthesizers in history, selling an estimated 250,000 units, and was widely used in popular music and stock music in the late 1980s and early 1990s. The piano and organ presets were used in 1990s house music, such as the Madonna single "Vogue" and the Robin S single "Show Me Love".

== Development ==
Korg's chief engineer, Junichi Ikeuchi, led the hardware engineering design of the M1. Whereas many previous synthesizers had shipped with sounds chosen for different markets, the Korg chairman, Tsutomu Kato, and his son, Seiki, decided that their synthesizers should use the same sounds internationally. Korg assembled an international team to develop the sounds. To create a deep blown bottle sound, the team played a pan flute over a large sake bottle.

== Features ==
The M1 features a 61-note velocity- and aftertouch-sensitive keyboard, 16-note polyphony, a joystick for pitch-bend and modulation control, an eight-track MIDI sequencer, separate LFOs for vibrato and filter modulation, and ADSR envelopes. Data can be stored on RAM and PCM cards.

The M1 has a ROM with four megabytes of 16-bit PCM tones — a large amount at the time — including instruments that had not been used extensively in mainstream music. The sounds include sampled attack transients, loops, sustained waveforms and percussive samples. The timbres include piano, strings, acoustic guitar, woodwinds, sitar, kalimba, wind chimes, and drums. Fact described the sounds as "wonderfully, endearingly wonky ... each one managed to sound simultaneously realistic and synthetic all at once".

The M1 also features effects, including reverb, delay, chorus, tremolo, EQ, distortion, and Leslie simulation, an innovative inclusion at the time. According to Sound on Sound, none of the M1's features was unique, but each was implemented and combined in a new way.

== Reception ==
The M1 was released in 1988. In the UK, it was sold for a retail price of £1499. It was manufactured until 1995, having sold an estimated 250,000 units.

Reviewing the M1 for Sound on Sound, Tony Hastings wrote that it was "destined to be big, very big", with "sensational" sounds and extensive features that outperformed its competitors. It was widely used in popular music and stock music in the late 1980s and early 1990s.

The piano and organ presets were used in 1990s house music, such as the 1990 Madonna single "Vogue", the 1990 Robin S single "Show Me Love". Other tracks that used the M1 include "Rhythm is a Dancer" (1992) by Snap, "Money, Cash, Hoes" (1998) by Jay-Z and "Beth/Rest" (2012) by Bon Iver.

In 2002, the Sound on Sound journalist Mark Vail wrote that the M1 was the bestselling synthesizer in history, although he noted that Korg had not verified the sales figures. Both Sound and Sound and Fact described it as the most popular synthesizer of all time. Fact attributed the success to its sampling and sequencer features, which allowed musicians to produce entire tracks without a studio before the rise of digital audio workstations.

== Variants ==
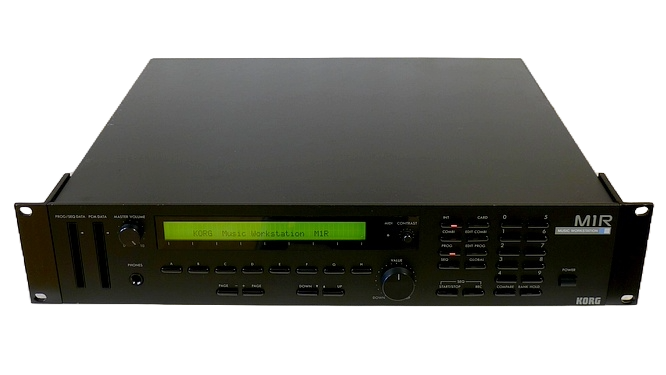
A Korg M1R rack-mounted module

Following the success of the M1, Korg released several new workstations, including the T-series in 1989, the 01-series in 1991, the X-series in 1993, and the N-series in 1996. The 01/W built upon the M1 AI synthesis with the enhanced AI2 system, which introduced additional effects and digital waveshaping. Rack-mountable versions of the M1 include the M1R and the more affordable M3R. Additionally, Korg released the M1EX and the M1REX rackmount, both featuring sounds from the T-series.

In 2005, Korg released a software version of the M1 as part of the Korg Legacy Collection. This digital version features 8-part multitimbrality, 256-note polyphony and presets from all 19 optional ROM cards. In December 2010, another software version, Korg M01, was released for the Nintendo DS handheld game console. It was developed by AQ Interactive and featured 8-part multitimbrality, 12-note polyphony, and the 300 original M1 PCM sounds.

== See also ==
- Korg
