= Korg DW-8000 =

Hybrid digital-analog synthesizer

DW-8000
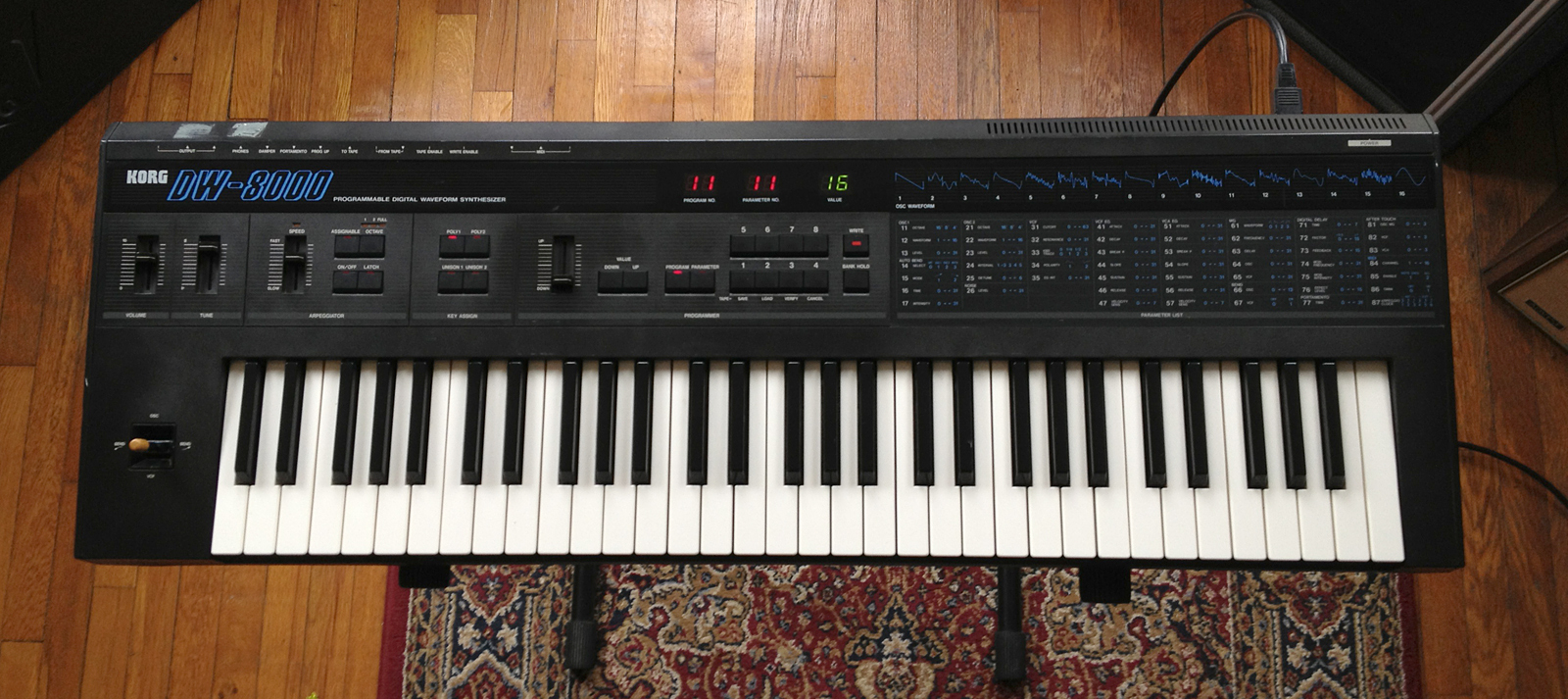
- Manufacturer: Korg
- Dates: 1985 - 1987

Technical specifications
- Polyphony: 8
- Timbrality: 1
- Oscillator: 2 DWGS waveforms per voice
- LFO: 1
- Synthesis type: Hybrid (digital DWGS oscillators, analog VCF/VCA)
- Filter: 4-pole resonant low-pass
- Attenuator: ADBSSR envelope generator
- Aftertouch expression: yes
- Velocity expression: yes
- Storage memory: 64
- Effects: Digital delay

Input/output
- Keyboard: 61-key mono-pressure sensitive
- Left-hand control: Joystick
- External control: MIDI

The Korg DW-8000 is a hybrid digital-analog synthesizer released in 1985. It blends digital waveforms with an analog filter and VCA, followed by a digital delay for adding echo effects. It boasts eight-note polyphony and its keyboard is equipped with velocity sensitivity and aftertouch.

== Background ==
The DW-8000 was released shortly after Korg's previous polysynth, the DW-6000, and built upon its predecessor's sound engine by enhancing it with velocity sensitivity, a digital delay effect, and expanded eight-voice polyphony. It also introduced 16 digital waveforms, doubling the DW-6000's eight, along with an arpeggiator, an additional key assign mode, additional modulation waveforms, and an "auto-bend" feature.

== Sounds and features ==
The DW-8000 features a five-octave keyboard with aftertouch capabilities affecting modulation, filter, and volume, alongside 64 preset slots, a joystick, an arpeggiator, and MIDI. The front panel features two buttons for program and parameter selection, numeric keys for choosing program and parameter numbers, and a data slider with +/— buttons for more precise parameter editing, echoing the design used on the Korg Poly-61, Korg's first synthesizer with digital controls.

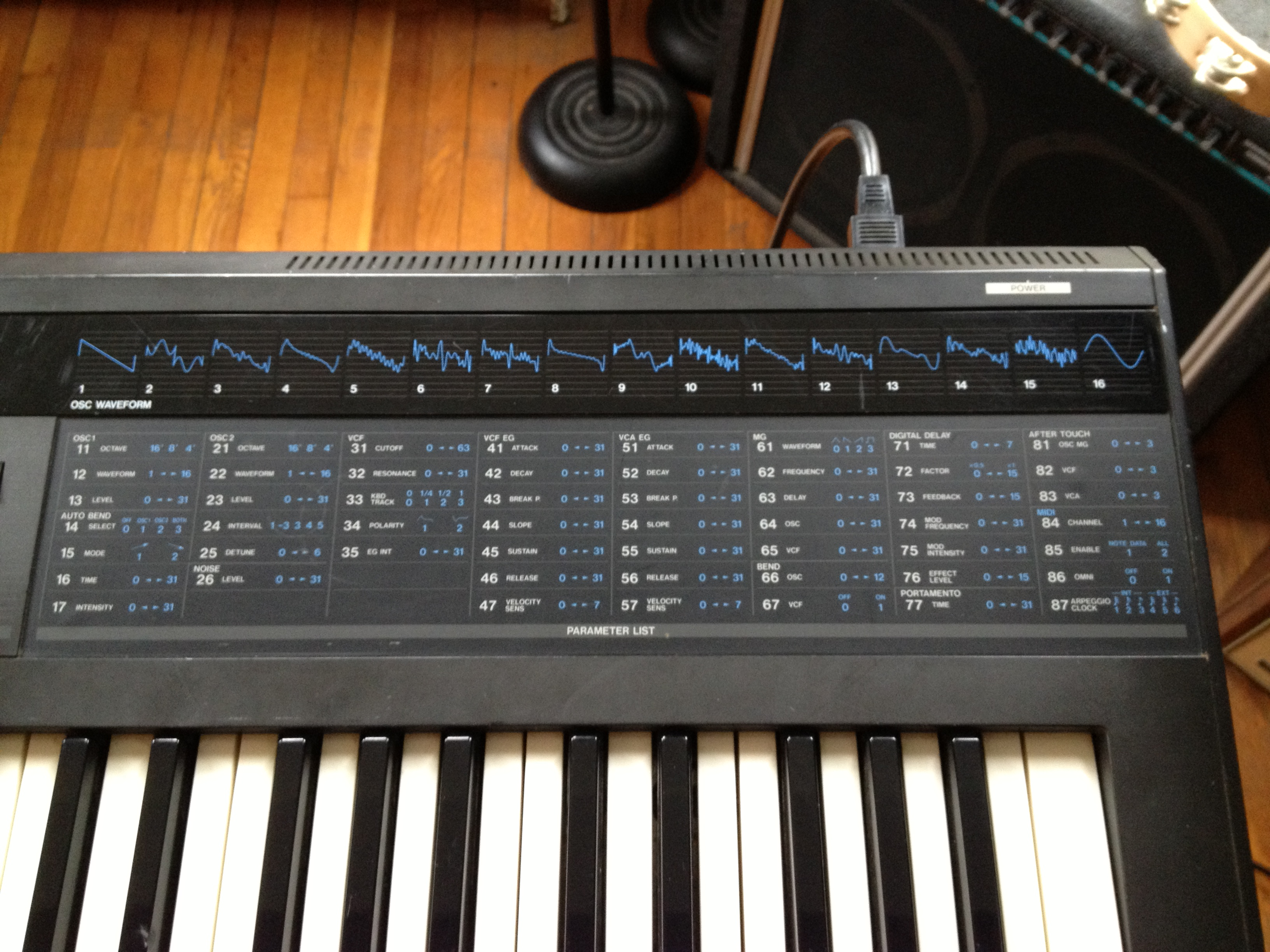
DW-8000 waveforms are illustrated on the front panel.

The DW-8000 employs Korg's Digital Waveform Generator System (DWGS), which features sampled waveforms stored across four 256 Kbit ROM chips. These waveforms range from standard synth shapes like sawtooth, square, and sine, to more complex sounds including bells, clavinets, acoustic and electric pianos, organs, guitars, and saxophones. A unique sample is utilized for each octave, and the waveforms were created using additive synthesis, which were then encoded onto the ROM chips. The DW-8000 features two oscillators, offering controls to modify their relative volumes and detune the second oscillator, creating a rich chorus-like effect.

There are various key assign modes, including polyphonic and polyphonic portamento. Unison modes combine all eight voices for a fuller monophonic sound, however, it lacks the ability to detune voices in unison mode. The DW-8000's voltage-controlled amplifier (VCA) and voltage-controlled filter (VCF) are analog, which contributes to its rich sound. The VCF's resonance produces a clear whistle at high settings and a warm sound at lower pitches. Keyboard velocity and aftertouch can control volume and filter cutoff, and vibrato can be added using aftertouch. Both the VCA and VCF envelopes feature six-stage envelopes featuring Attack, Decay, Break Point, Slope, Sustain and Release stages, allowing for complex envelope shapes to be created.

The DW-8000 features a digital delay effect with adjustable delay times up to 500 milliseconds, and controls for delay time, feedback, effect level, and modulation. These settings allow for a range of effects including flanging, double tracking and long echo effects. These delay settings can be saved with the synth patch for easy recall. It also features an 'auto-bend' option for initial note slides. It allows subtle or pronounced note adjustments, akin to a trumpet's entry or portamento. Settings include time, intensity, and the ability to choose whether it affects oscillator one, two, or both. The built-in arpeggiator includes controls for tempo control, octave range, pattern modes for up/down and assign, and a Latch function for sustaining arpeggios after releasing the keys. It can also sync to external MIDI clock signals.

The DW-8000 can store 64 patches, and the optional MEX8000 memory expander allows users to access four more banks, each holding 64 patches.

== EX8000 ==
The EX-8000 is the rack-mounted counterpart to the DW-8000, containing all the same features except the arpeggiator.
