= Korg Polysix =

Synthesizer

Polysix
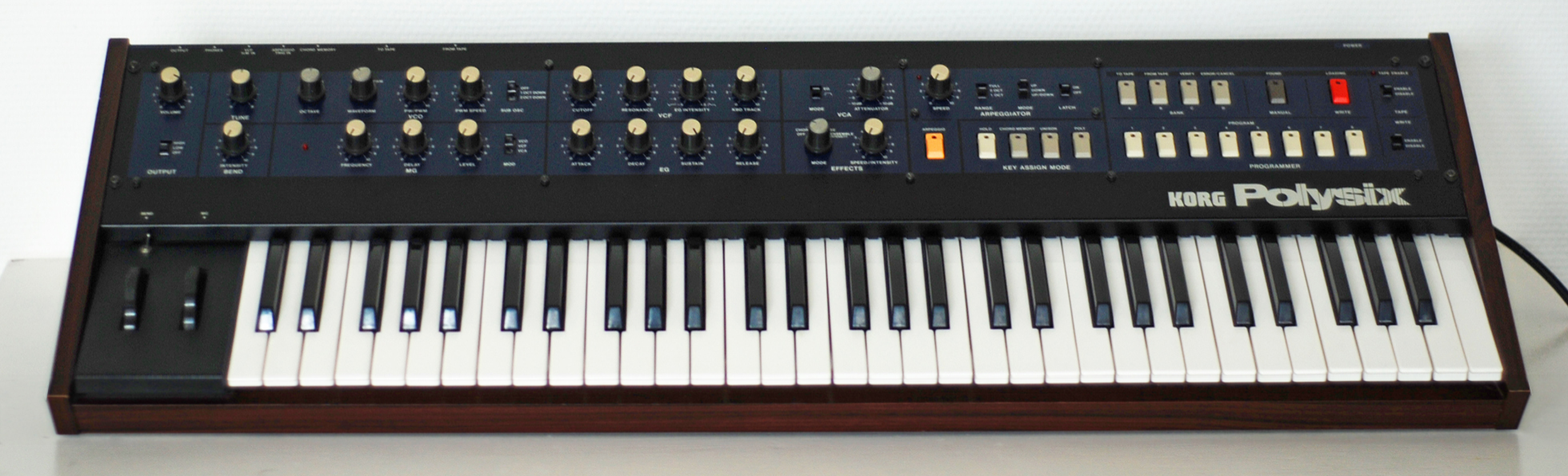
- KORG Polysix
- Manufacturer: Korg
- Dates: 1981
- Price: US$1095; UK£899

Technical specifications
- Polyphony: 6 voice
- Timbrality: Monotimbral
- Oscillator: 1 VCO with 1 sub-oscillator per voice
- LFO: 1
- Synthesis type: Analog Subtractive
- Filter: Resonant low-pass
- Attenuator: 1 x ADSR
- Aftertouch expression: No
- Velocity expression: No
- Storage memory: 32 patches
- Effects: Chorus, Phaser, Ensemble

Input/output
- Keyboard: 61-key
- External control: CV/Gate

The Korg Polysix (PS-6) is a six-voice polyphonic analog synthesizer released by Korg in 1981. It was one of the first affordable polyphonic synthesizers on the market, and was released as a cheaper alternative to the Sequential Prophet-5 and Oberheim OB-X, priced at approximately a third of the cost of its contemporaries in the polysynth market. It includes one VCO per voice, enhanced by a suboscillator per voice plus chorus/ensemble effect for added richness. It also comes equipped with 32 program memories and an integrated arpeggiator.

== Development ==
Before the introduction of the Polysix, Korg had not yet ventured into the market of modern, polyphonic synthesizers that featured dynamic voice allocation. During this period, the market was dominated by microprocessor-controlled synthesizers such as the Sequential Circuits Prophet 5 and the Oberheim OB-X. Instead of directly competing with these high-end synthesizers, Korg aimed to create a more accessible and cost-effective instrument with the Polysix. Upon its launch, the Polysix was one of the first polyphonic analog synthesizers available for under $2,000 in the United States and £1,000 in the United Kingdom, marking a significant milestone in making polyphonic synthesis more accessible to a wider audience.

In order to reduce costs, the Polysix was designed with only one oscillator per voice, unlike its contemporaries, the Prophet-5 and OB-X, which featured two oscillators per voice. To compensate for this limitation, the Polysix added a suboscillator per voice and incorporated built-in chorus, phaser, and ensemble effects (each with adjustable intensity) which were creating utilizing a bucket brigade analog delay line design. At the time of its release, the inclusion of an on-board chorus was relatively uncommon.

The Polysix offered six-voice polyphony and also included 32 memory slots for patch storage, a cassette port for backing up patches, and an arpeggiator. The release of the Polysix was just months before Roland introduced the Juno 6, which was a main competitor to the Polysix, which also featured a single oscillator and suboscillator per voice and an onboard chorus effect.

== Sounds and features ==
The Polysix features a straightforward synthesis architecture. Each of its voices is equipped with one oscillator capable of producing a sawtooth wave, variable pulse wave, or pulse-width modulation (PWM) outputs, with the PWM option having a dedicated low-frequency oscillator (LFO). Additionally, a sub-oscillator provides the option to add a square wave at one or two octaves below the main VCO pitch. The filter has controls for cutoff frequency, resonance, envelope amount and keyboard tracking. Its envelope generator, which is of the ADSR type, includes a unique centre-zero control, allowing users to choose between normal and inverted envelope shapes.

The VCA can be operated from either the envelope or a gate signal. The combined output of all voices can be processed through an effects section, which provides three modulated delay-based effects: Chorus, Phaser or Ensemble. These effects significantly enhance the sound, contributing to its richness and depth, a key feature at the time of release.

== Repair and Retrofits ==
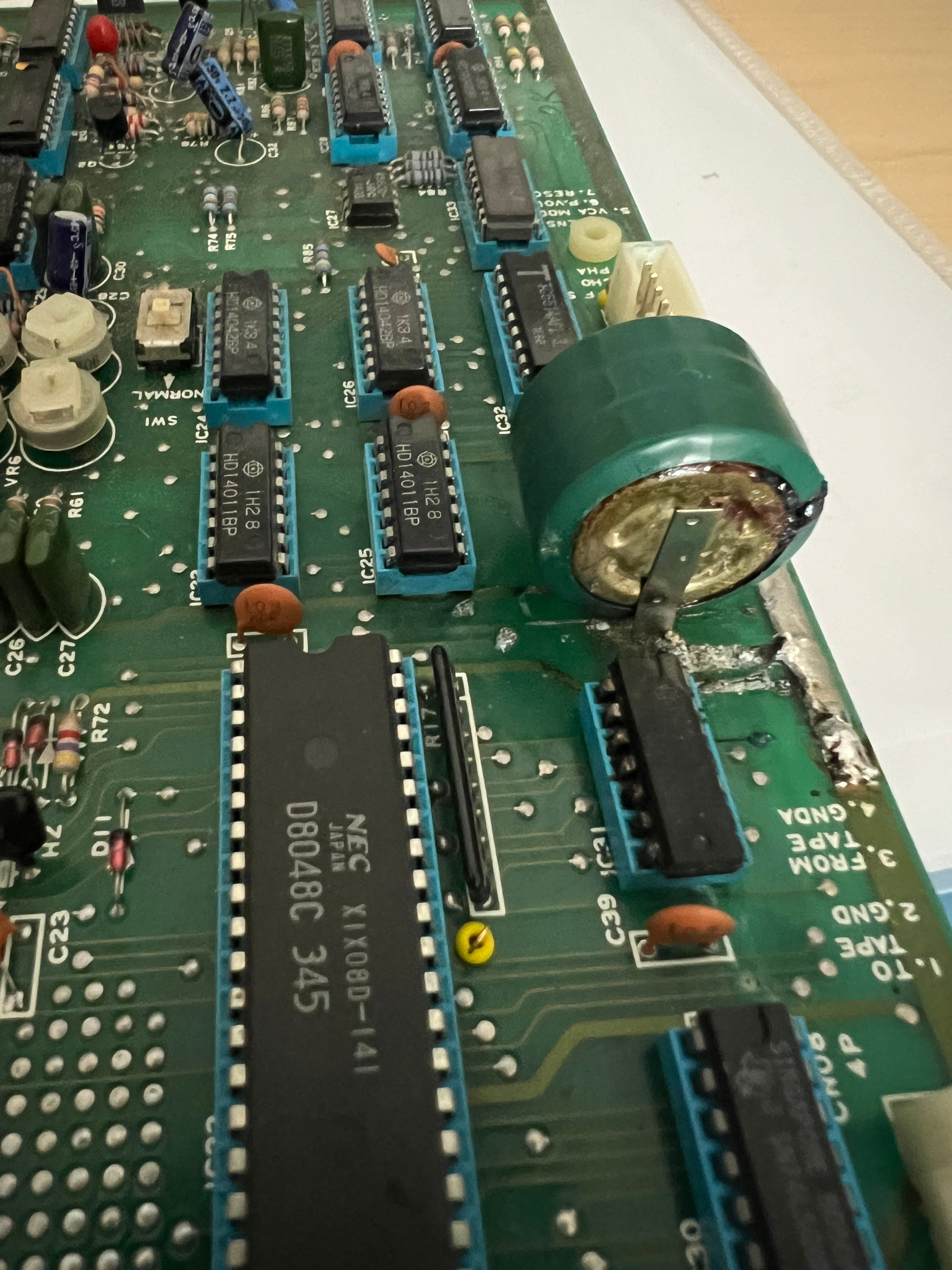
Leaking Polysix battery having corroded PCB traces on the KLM-367 board

One weakness of the technology was the construction of the KLM-367 programmer board. To store the sounds, the volatile RAM chip had to be buffered by a storage battery. This battery would start leaking after a couple of years, and the alkaline battery fluid would eat away the traces on the programmer board PCB, damaging the synthesizer, as well as shorting circuitry as the battery fluid is conductive. To fix it, the broken PCB traces have to be replaced by soldering connections; as an alternative, there are clones of the programmer board available made by several sources.

As the original Polysix did not have MIDI, retrofits have been made available e.g. by Kenton, Tubbutec, and Kiwi Electronics.

== Software ==
In 2004, Korg released a software emulator of the Polysix as part of the Korg Legacy Collection, which offers a digital emulation of the Polysix with modern features like MIDI compatibility and additional controls. The Polysix Legacy engine was included as part of the LAC-1 expansion for the Korg OASYS in 2006, and was also included as one of the sound engines in the Korg Kronos, released in 2011.

In 2013, Korg introduced an iOS emulation of the Polysix for the iPad called iPolysix as well as a Polysix instrument for Propellerhead Reason 7.
