= Korg =

Japanese musical instrument company

KORG Inc.
- Native name: 株式会社コルグ
- Formerly: Keio Electronic Laboratories
- Type: Private
- Industry: Electronics
- Founded: 1962; 64 years ago (as Keio Electronic Laboratories)
- Founders: Tsutomu Kato; Tadashi Osanai
- Headquarters: Inagi, Tokyo, Japan
- Products: Electronic musical instruments
- Subsidiaries: Vox; ARP Instruments
- Website: www.korg.com

KORG Inc. (Japanese: 株式会社コルグ, Hepburn: Kabushiki-gaisha Korugu), founded as Keio Electronic Laboratories, is a Japanese multinational corporation that manufactures electronic musical instruments, audio processors and guitar pedals, recording equipment, and electronic tuners. Under the Vox brand name, it also manufactures guitar amplifiers and electric guitars.

== History ==
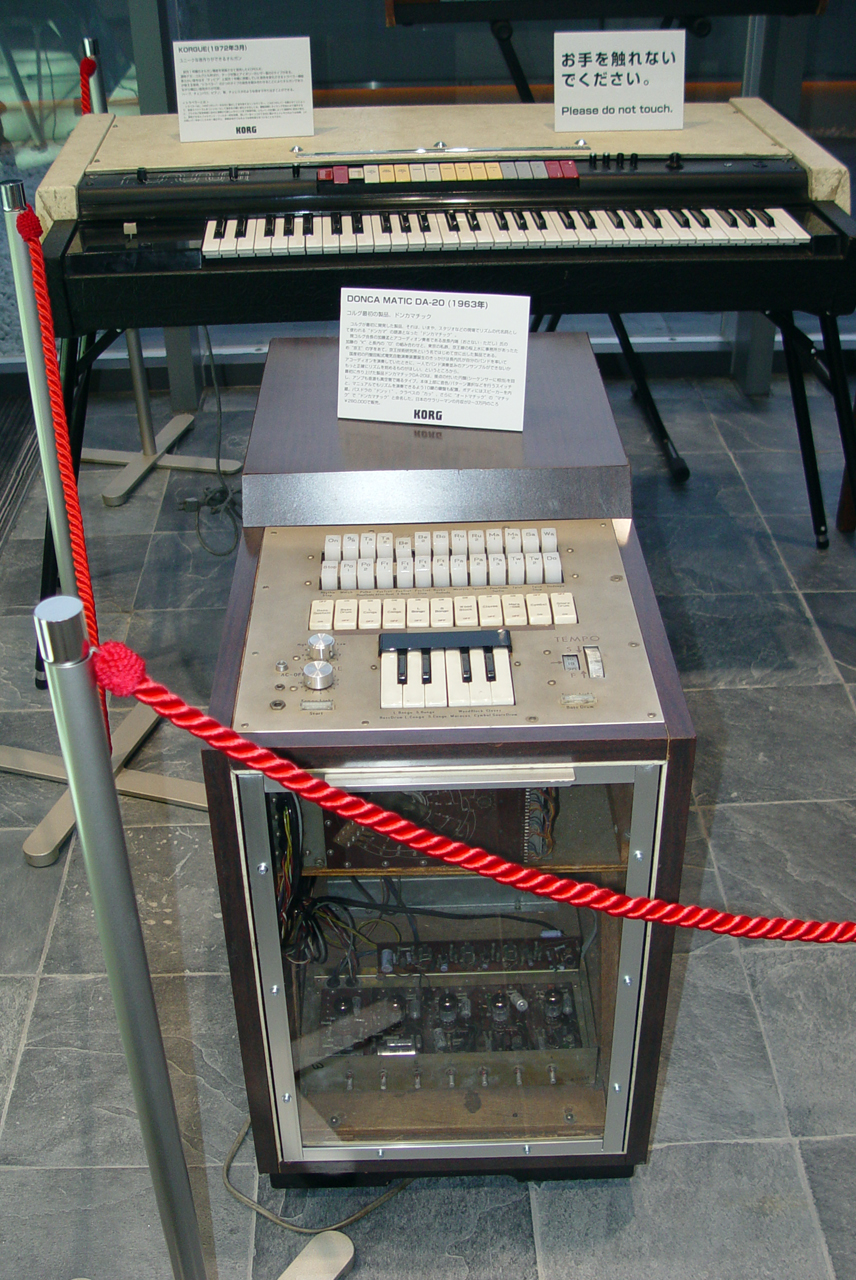
Donca-Matic DA-20 (1963)

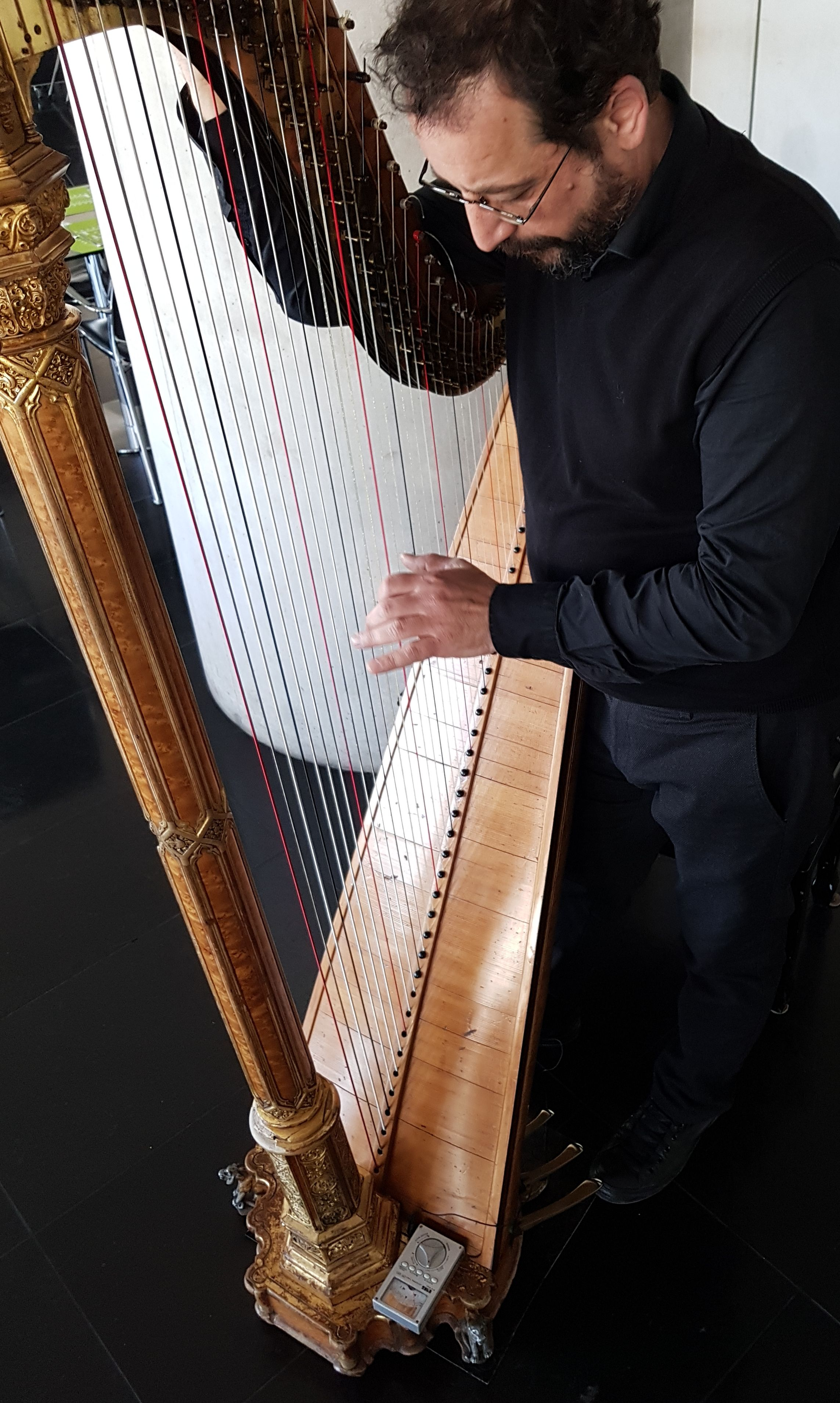
Tuning of a Sébastien Érard harp using the KORG OT-120 Wide 8 Octave Orchestral Digital Tuner

KORG was founded in 1962 in Tokyo by Tsutomu Kato and Tadashi Osanai as Keio Gijutsu Kenkyujo Ltd.. It later became Keio Electronic Laboratories (京王技術研究所) because its offices were located near the Keio train line in Tokyo and Keio can be formed by combining the first letters of Kato and Osanai. Before founding the company, Kato ran a nightclub. Osanai, a Tokyo University graduate and noted accordionist, regularly performed at Kato's club accompanied by a Wurlitzer Sideman rhythm machine. Dissatisfied with the rhythm machine, Osanai convinced Kato to finance his efforts to build a better one.

The company's first product was an electro-mechanical rhythm device, the Disc Rotary Electric Auto Rhythm machine, Donca Matic DA-20, released in 1963. The name "Donca" was an onomatopoeic reference to the sound the rhythm machine made. Buoyed by the success of the DA-20, Keio released a solid-state version of the Rhythm machine, the Donca matic DE-20, in 1966.

In 1967, Kato was approached by Fumio Mieda, an engineer seeking to build keyboards. Impressed with Mieda's enthusiasm, Kato asked him to build a prototype, and 18 months later Mieda returned with a programmable organ. Keio introduced the organ under the name KORG; the KO being a phonetic reading of "Keio", combined with ORG from "organ". In 1970 the firm name changed again to Keio Giken Kogyo Inc. (京王技研工業株式会社).

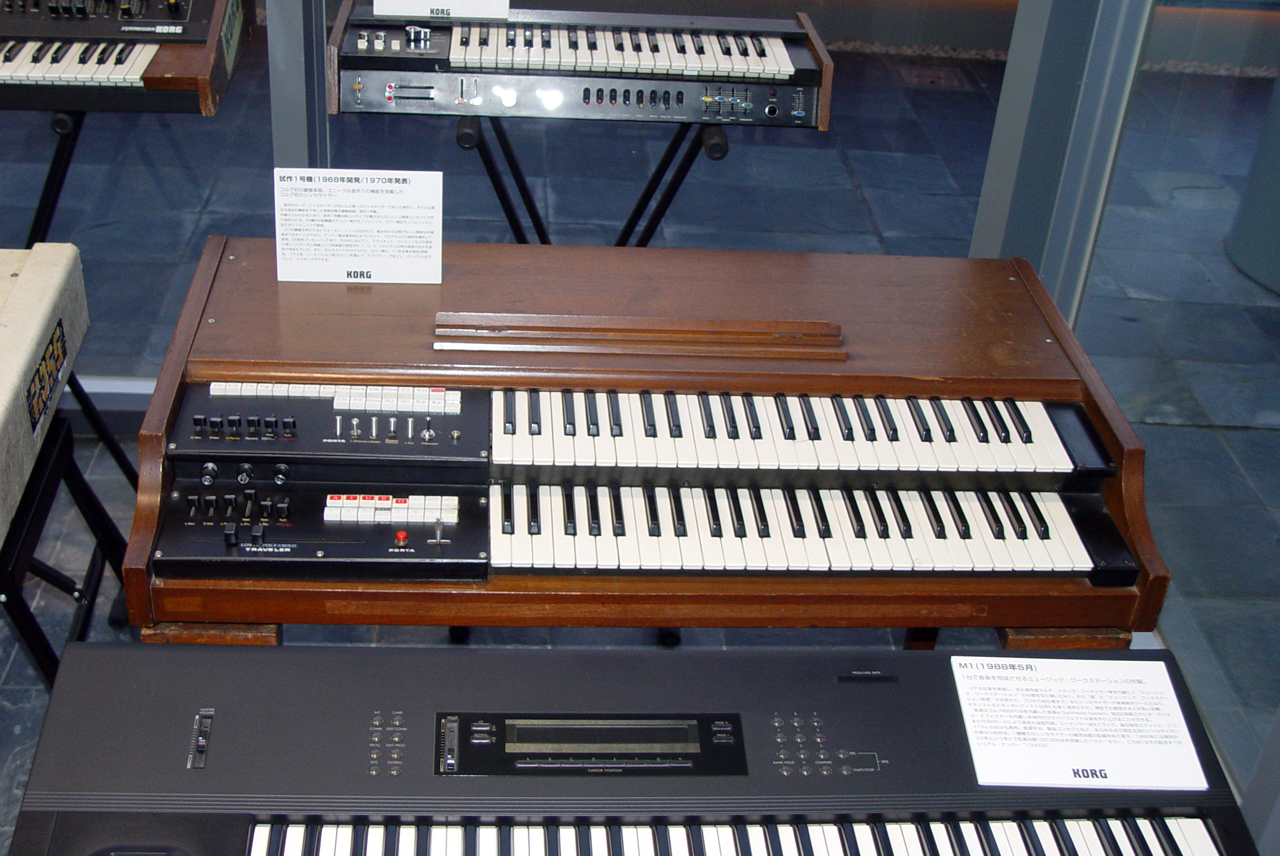
Prototype No.1 (1970)

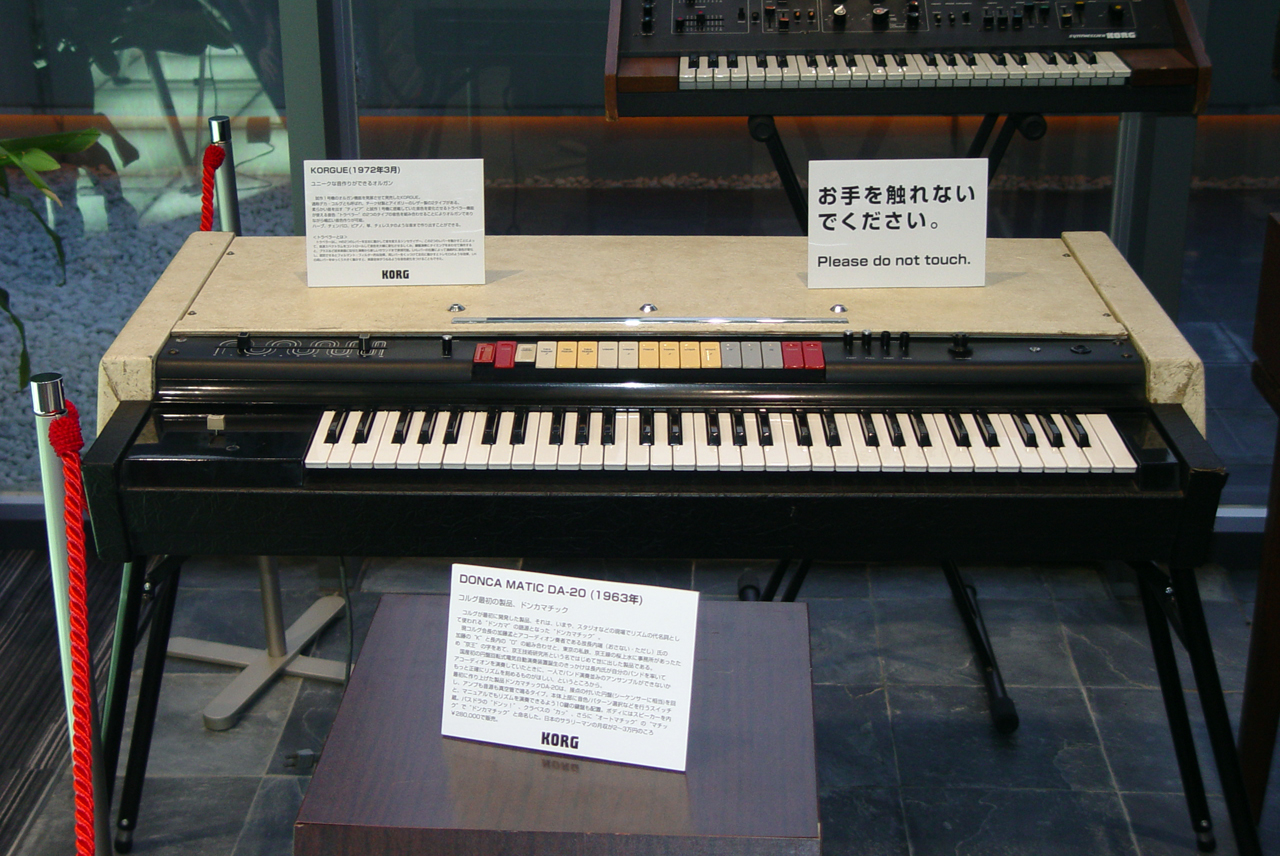
KORGUE (1972)

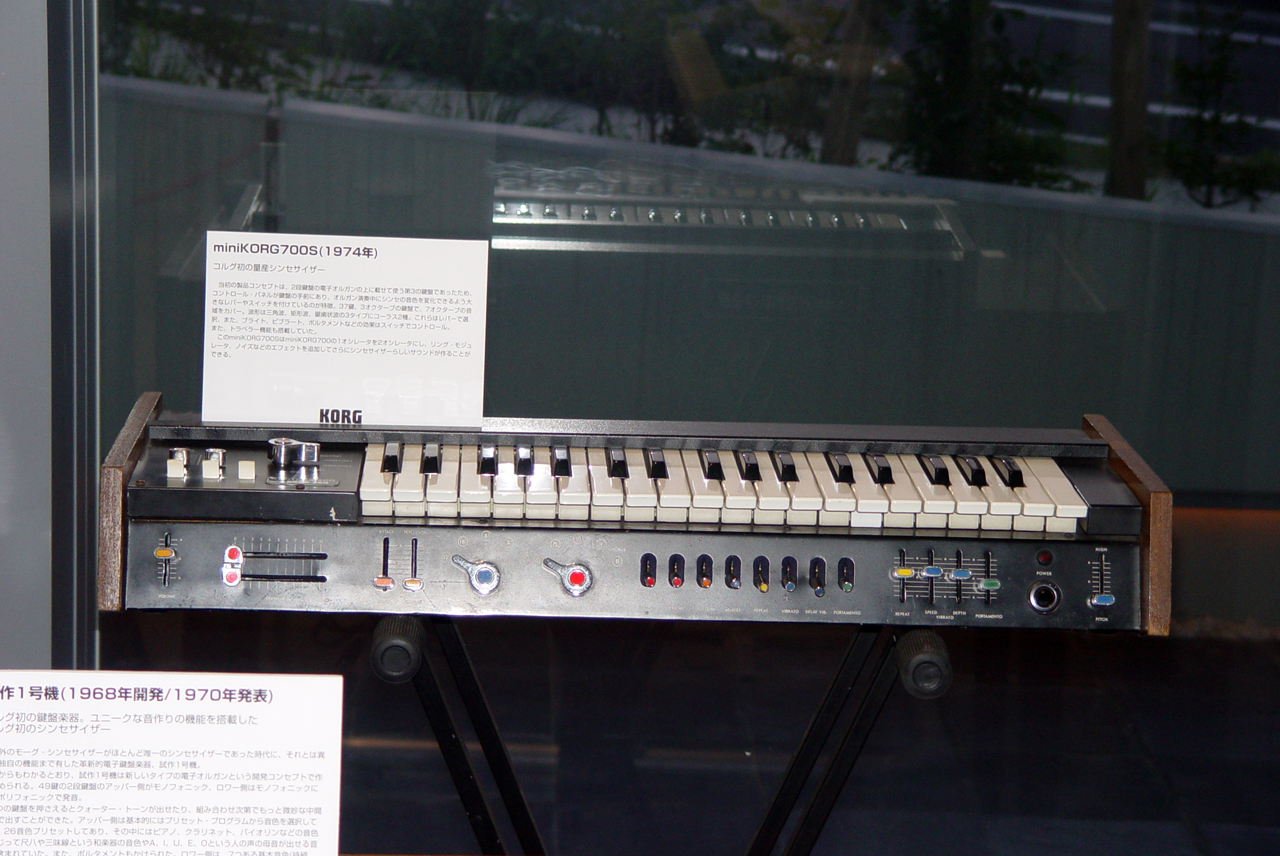
miniKORG 700S (1974)

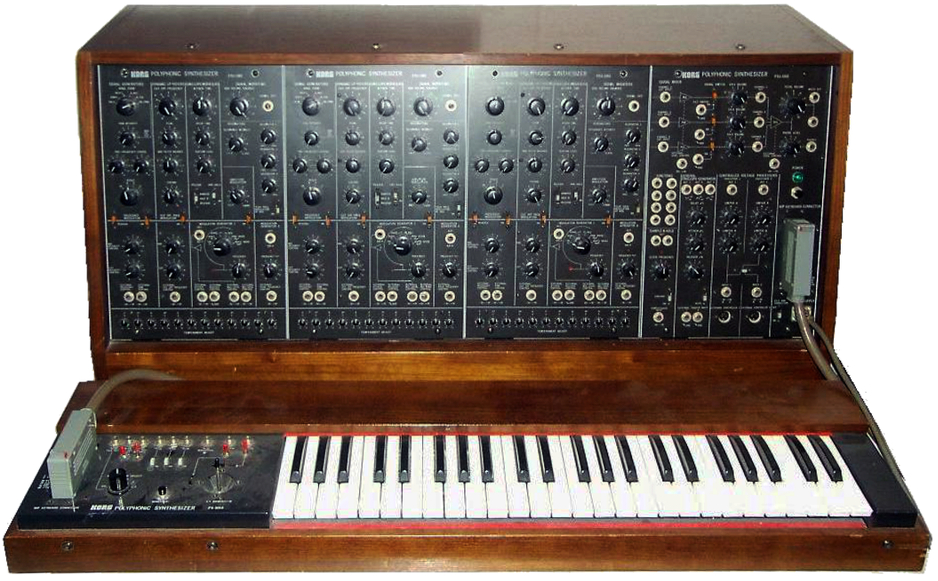
PS-3300 (1977)

Keio's organ products were successful throughout the late 1960s and early 1970s. Concerned about competition from other organ manufacturers, Kato decided to use the organ technology to build a keyboard for the then-niche synthesizer market. Keio's first synthesizer, the KORG miniKORG, was released in 1973.

During the 1970s, KORG's synthesizer line was divided into instruments for the hobbyist, and large expensive patchable instruments such as the PS series. In the early 1980s, KORG branched into digital pianos. KORG co-founder Tadashi Osanai died in 1977 and Kato continued running the company.

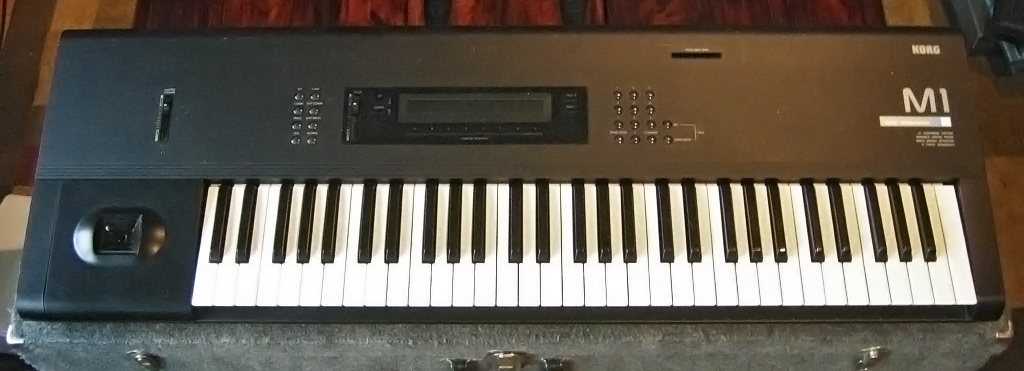
M1 (1988)

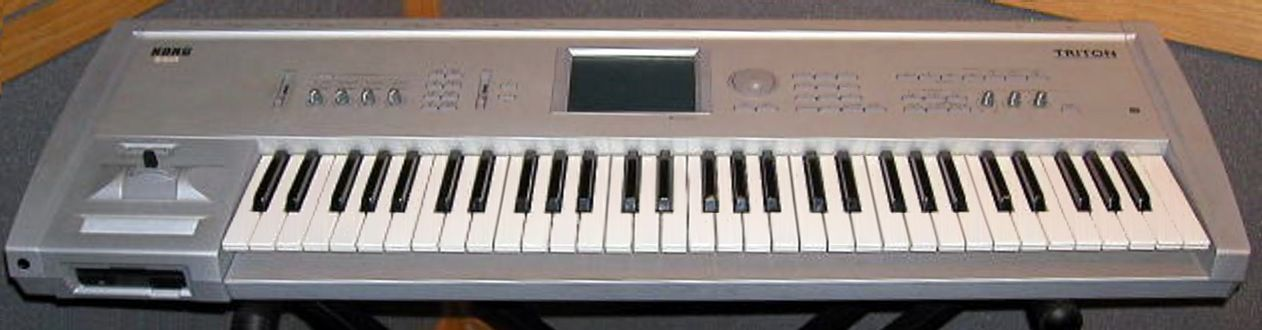
Triton (1999~2004)

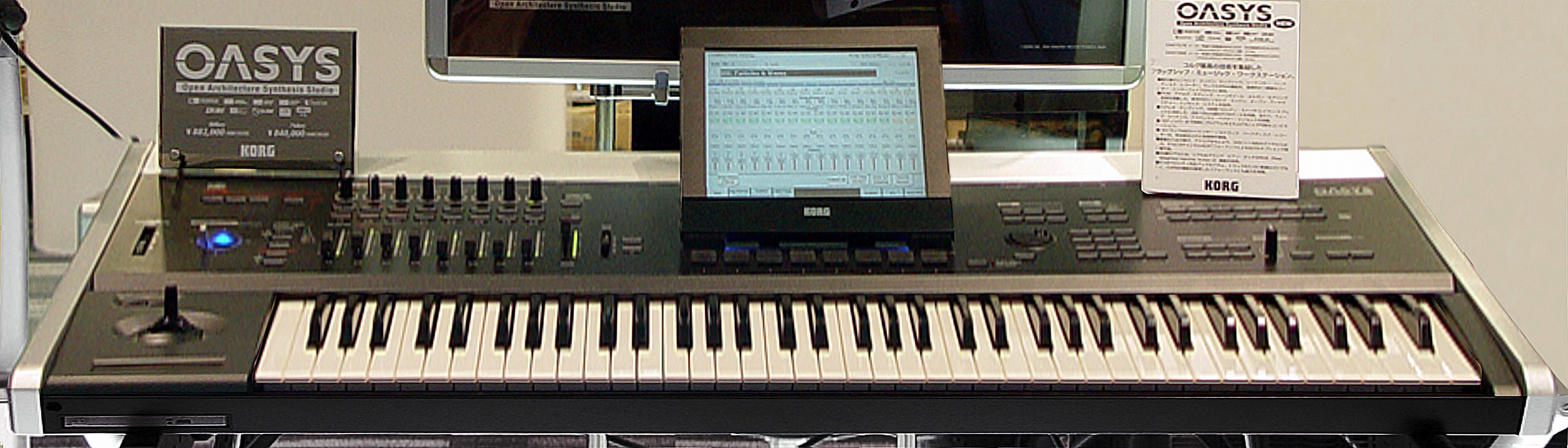
OASYS (2005)

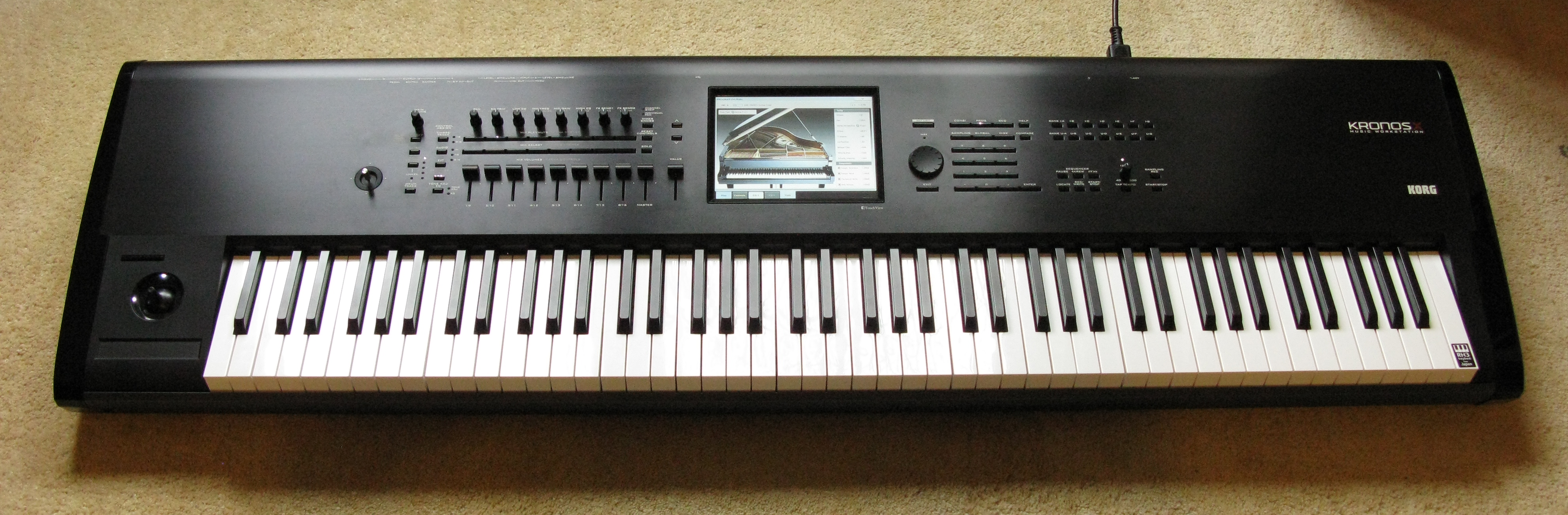
Kronos X (2012)

KORG is credited with a number of innovations. The key transpose function was Kato's idea after a singer at his club needed her accompaniment played in a lower key, which the accompanist wasn't able to do. KORG was the first company to feature effects on a synthesizer, and the first to use a sample + synthesis sound design. The M1 workstation, released in 1988, sold over 250,000 units, making it the bestselling synthesizer ever at that time.

=== Relationship with Yamaha ===
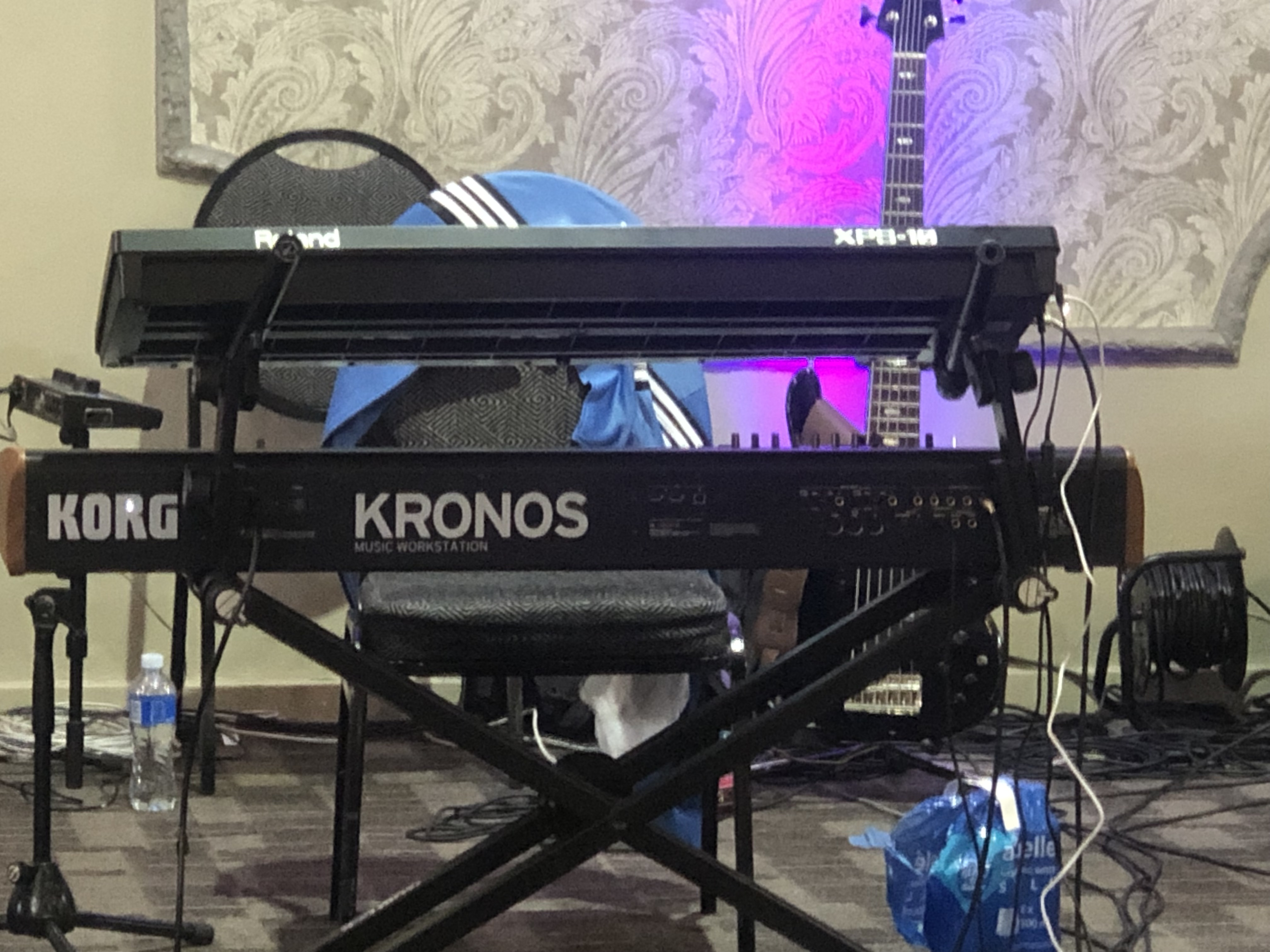
Korg Kronos

Yamaha Corporation has always been a major partner of KORG, supplying them with circuitry and mechanical parts.

In 1987, shortly before the release of the M1 Music Workstation, Yamaha acquired a controlling interest in KORG. The takeover of the company was amicable, with Kato drawing up the terms, and the two companies continued to independently develop their product lines and compete in the marketplace.

In 1989, KORG recruited the design team from Sequential Circuits as they were relieved of their duties by then-Sequential owner Yamaha.

In 1993, after 5 successful years under Yamaha's control, Kato had sufficient funds to repurchase most of the Yamaha shares.

=== Recent history ===
KORG has since diversified into digital effects, tuners, recording equipment, electronic hand percussion, and software instruments.

In 1992, KORG acquired Vox, then primarily a manufacturer of guitar amplifiers.

KORG was the exclusive distributor of Marshall Amplification products in the US for decades. This arrangement ended in 2010.

Kato died of cancer on 15 March 2011.

The new line of more accessible digital synthesizers, including the wavestate, modwave and opsix, are featuring a Raspberry Pi Compute Module 3.

In September 2022, Korg bought Darkglass Electronics.

== See also ==
- Category:Korg synthesizers
- Electronic tuner
