= PPG Wave =

Synthesizer

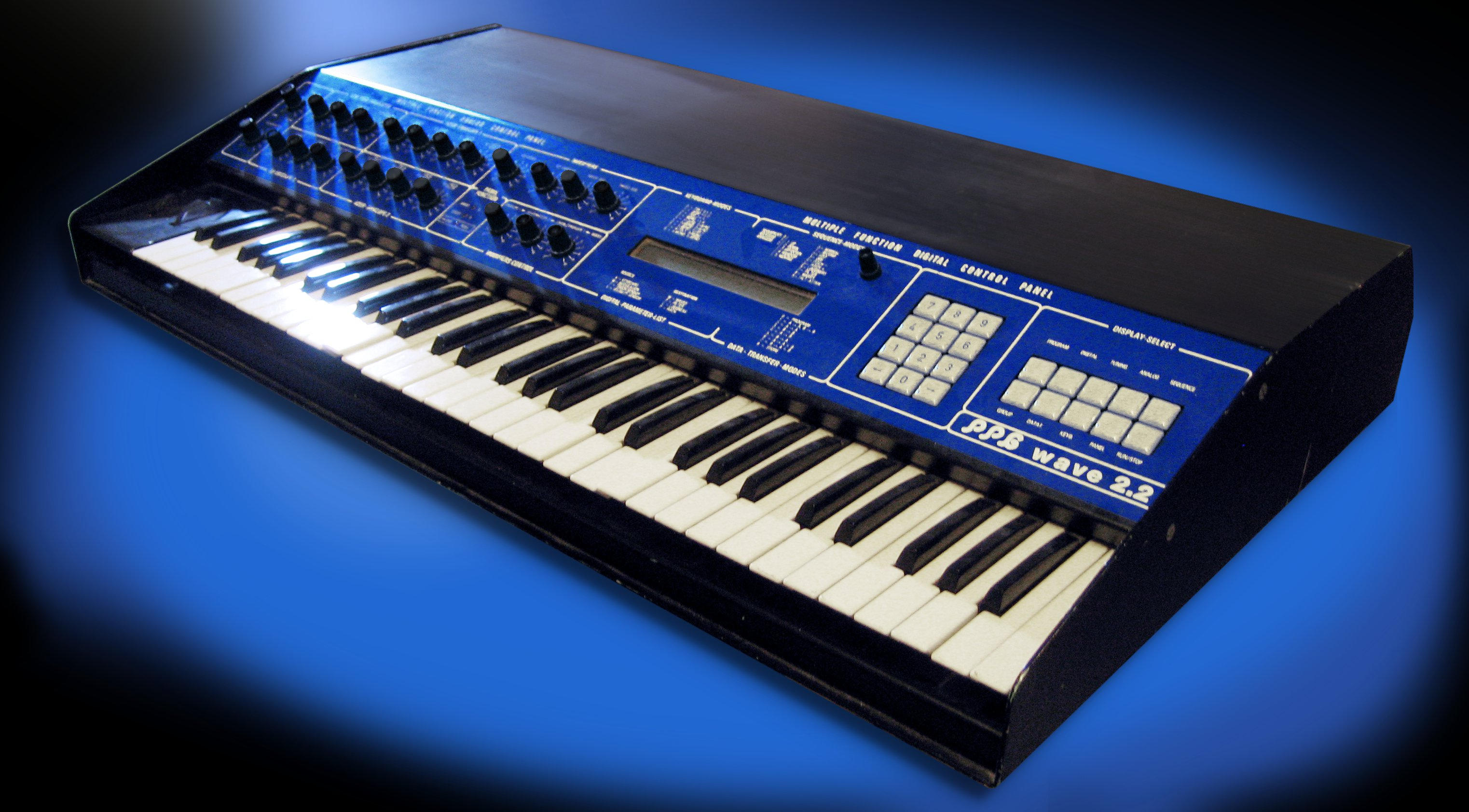
PPG Wave 2.2

The PPG Wave is a series of synthesizers built by the German company Palm Products GmbH from 1981 to 1987.

== Background ==
Until the early 1980s, the tonal palette of commercial synthesizers was limited to that which could be obtained by combining a few simple waveforms such as sine, sawtooth, pulse. The result was shaped with VCFs and VCAs. Wolfgang Palm transcended this limitation by pioneering the concept of wavetable synthesis, where single cycle waveforms of differing harmonic spectra were stored in adjacent memory slots. Dynamic spectral shifts were achieved by scanning through the waveforms, with interpolation used to avoid noticeable 'jumps' between the adjacent waveforms. Palm's efforts resulted in PPG's first wavetable synthesizer, the Wavecomputer 360 (1978), which provides the user with 30 different wavetables consisting of 64 waves each. While the expansive range of sound is evident, the absence of filters results in the Wavecomputer 360 sounding buzzy and thin, which hampered its original commercial viability. Palm's efforts to resolve the apparent shortcomings of the Wavecomputer 360 would result in the creation of PPG's Wave series of synthesizers.

== Specifications ==
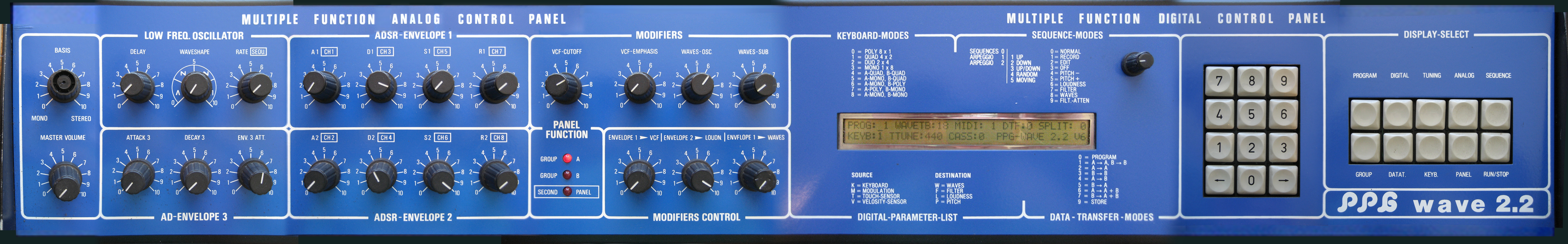
PPG Wave 2.2 front panel

PPG's Wave series represents an evolution of its predecessor by combining its digital sound engine with analog VCAs and 24db per octave VCFs, featuring 8-voice polyphony; and by replacing its nontraditional series of push buttons and sliders with a control panel consisting of an LCD and a more familiar arrangement of knobs. Also added to the Wave series was an onboard sequencer that is capable of recording filtering and wavetable changes in real time. At the core of the Wave's processing unit is a Motorola 6809 CPU, and a variety of 6500 and 6800-series support ICs. MIDI support was added in 1984, via a 6840/6850 daughtercard.

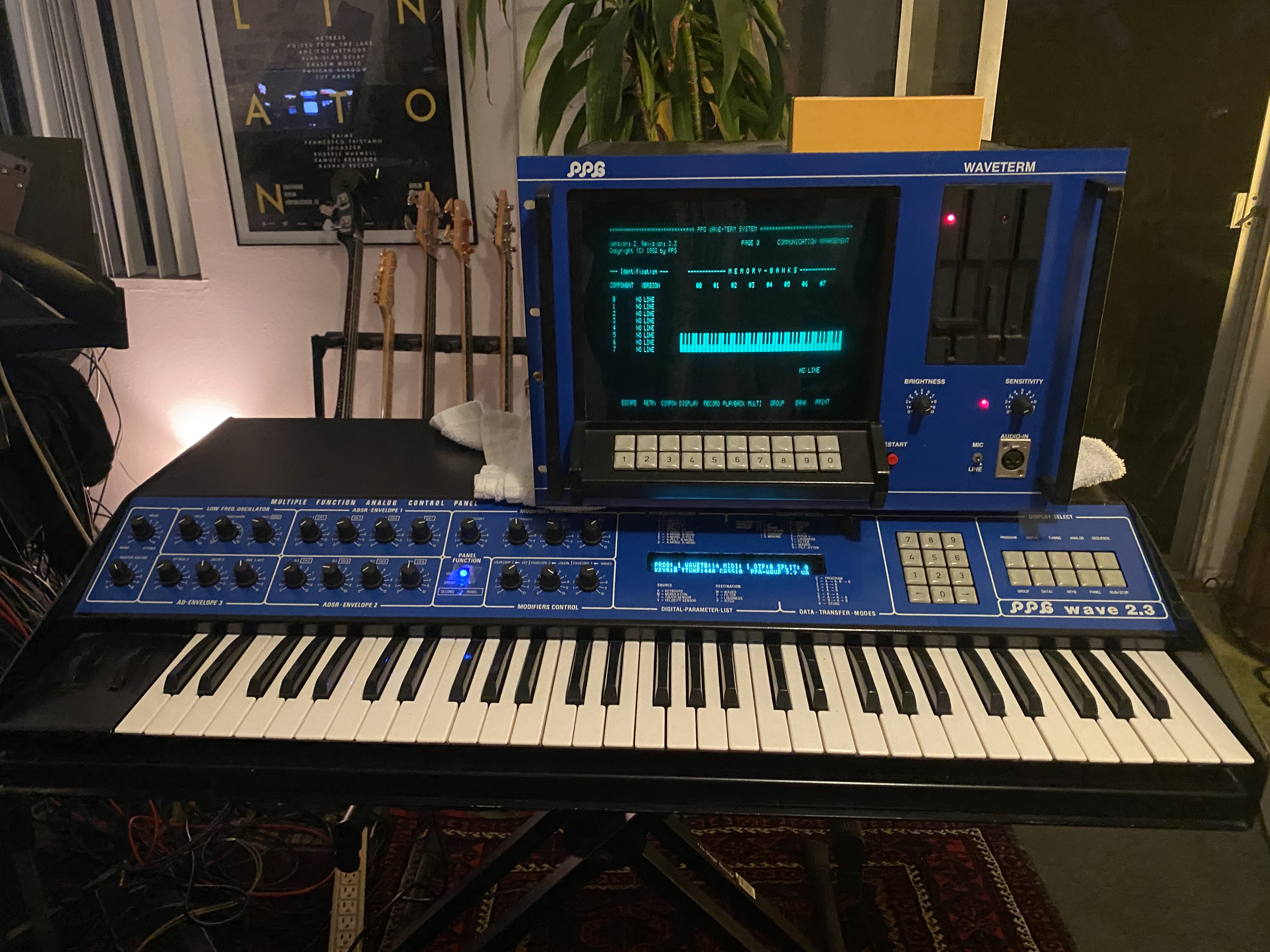
PPG Waveterm B on Wave 2.3

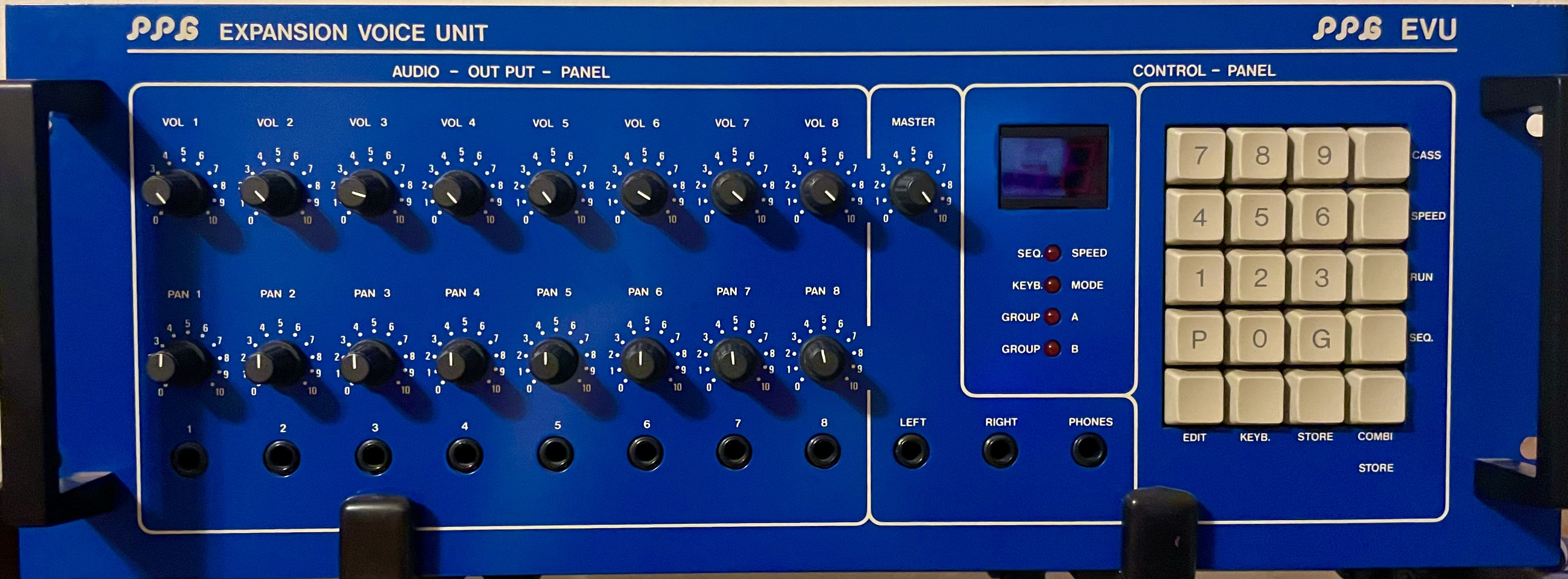
PPG EVU (Eight-Voice expansion Units)

The PPG Wave was produced in three successive variants, the control panels of which were all liveried in distinctive ultramarine RAL 5002 blue:

- Wave 2 (1981–1982) - 8 oscillators (one per voice), 8-bit resolution, single modulation wheel, CEM 3320 VCFs
- Wave 2.2 (1982–1984) - 16 oscillators (two per voice), 8-bit resolution, dual modulation wheels, SSM 2044 VCFs
- Wave 2.3 (1984–1987) - 16 oscillators (two per voice), 12-bit resolution for samples via Waveterm (only) otherwise 8-bit, dual modulation wheels, SSM 2044 VCFs, 8-part multitimbrality

The PPG Wave can be connected to multiple peripheral PPG components simultaneously, via a custom bus, such as a "smart" keyboard controller (PRK), 8-voice expansion units (EVU), and a wave computer called Waveterm A (later B version arrived) for sampling, audio manipulation, editing, sequencing and creating user defined wavetables. Collectively, this setup is referred to as the "PPG Wave System", which with its sampling and sequencing was intended to compete with the more expensive Fairlight CMI.

== Market success ==
The PPG Wave quickly earned distinction from traditional analog synthesizers. Notable artists who used the Wave included: a-ha, Alphaville, Bronski Beat, David Bowie, Diane Arkenstone, the Fixx, Go West, Hall & Oates, Trevor Horn, Steven Halpern, Propaganda, Laza Ristovski, Marillion, Journey, Nits, Level 42, Art of Noise, Michael Jackson, Michael Omartian, Saga, Rush, Depeche Mode, Gary Numan, Robert Palmer, Gary Stadler, Kitaro, Jean-Benoit Dunckel, the Psychedelic Furs, Tangerine Dream, the Stranglers, Talk Talk, Tears for Fears, Michelle Tumes, the Twins, Silent Circle, Steve Winwood, Stevie Nicks, Styx, Thomas Dolby, Ultravox, Wang Chung, Eurogliders, Patrick O'Hearn, Stevie Wonder, Ilan Chester and Justice.

== Market decline ==
PPG's innovation in the realm of digital synthesizer technology impacted the industry. The PPG Wave synthesizer's price in its initial few years was US$7,000-10,000. Within a few years, digital synthesizers, such as the Yamaha DX7 (1983), Korg DW-8000 (1985), Ensoniq ESQ-1 (1986), and Sequential Prophet VS (1986), would be launched at lower prices. Furthermore, the rapidly evolving development of digital sampling technology and reductions in memory prices facilitated the emergence of a new generation of standalone, easy-to-use samplers, such as the Emu Emulator II (1984), Ensoniq Mirage (1984), and Sequential Prophet 2000 (1985). PPG's dwindling market share and the high development cost of new products created financial difficulties, that resulted in the cessation of company operations in 1987.

== After PPG ==
The end of PPG saw the beginning of Waldorf GmbH (later Waldorf Music), which used PPG's technology to create the Microwave (1989), a streamlined, rack-mounted approximation of the PPG Wave 2.3 with original wavetables and analog filters. Further evolutions of the original theme would appear in later years, including the extensive WAVE synthesizer (1993), the DSP-driven Microwave II (1997), and the knob-laden Microwave II variants, the XT and XTk (1998–1999).

After PPG, other manufacturers also produced Wavetable "look-up" synthesizers, such as Sequential's Prophet VS (1986) and Ensoniq's VFX series(1989) and later models such as SD and Fizmo which used Transwaves. Later came the arrival of synthesizers such as the Access Virus Ti (2005), Waldorf Blofeld (2007), which included 64 wavetables. None of these designs is exactly like the "wave-scanning" and interpolation that occurs from adjacent waves, in a table, as with the PPG. The Waldorf Quantum (2018) comes closer to the PPG in wavetable capabilities.

More recent advancements in personal computing technology made possible the release of VST plugin models of the original PPG Wave series, including Waldorf's Wave 2.V (2000), and Wave 3.V (2011). The latter was co-developed with Palm, and more accurately replicates the familiar aliasing and filtering characteristics of both the Wave 2.2 and 2.3. In 2024, Behringer released the Wave, a hardware clone of the 2.2 / 2.3 versions of the original PPG Wave.

== See also ==
- Wavetable synthesis
- Waldorf Music — The WAVE and Microwave
- Monowave
