= PPG =

PPG may stand for:

== Arts and media ==
- Pittsburgh Post-Gazette, an American newspaper in Pennsylvania (so named since 1927)
- Planning policy guidance notes, in United Kingdom law (1992–2012)
- The Powerpuff Girls (franchise), a cartoon superhero media franchise (since 1992)
  - The Powerpuff Girls, an American animated series (1998–2005)
  - Powerpuff Girls Z, a Japanese anime series (2006–2007)
  - The Powerpuff Girls (2016 TV series), an American reboot series

== Science and technology ==
- Pacific Proving Grounds, a former US-operated nuclear test site
- Photoplethysmograph, an optically obtained volumetric measurement of an organ
- Pterygopalatine ganglion, one of the four Parasympathetic ganglia of the head and neck
- Pteridophyte Phylogeny Group, a group promoting the taxonomy of pteridophytes

=== Chemistry ===
- Photolabile protecting group, a strategy to temporarily protect functional group(s) and liberate upon action of light
- Policosanol, a nutritional supplement
- PPG Industries, a U.S. manufacturer, formerly known as Pittsburgh Plate Glass
  - PPG Place, its office complex
- Polypropylene glycol, a polymer
- Post-prandial glucose, a measure of blood sugar after a meal
- Pounds per gallon, a measure of density, typically of a fluid. It is common in the oil industry, especially as a unit for Mud weight.
- Purpurogallin, the aglycon of several glycosides from nutgalls

=== Electronics & Electrical ===
- PPG Phonem, a vocal synthesizer
- Palm Products GmbH, an audio synthesizer company
- Penile plethysmograph a device to measure male arousal
- Push Proxy Gateway, a component of a WAP server in telecommunications
- Pulse pattern generator, a piece of electronic test equipment or software used to generate digital electronics stimuli
- Personal Protective Ground, a safety device that is conductive, used to ground electrical equipment in case of accidental energization during work

== Transport ==
- PPG tankette, a Soviet armoured vehicle
- IATA airport code for Pago Pago International Airport
- Powered paragliding, a form of ultralight aviation

== Other uses ==
- Palestinian Presidential Guard
- Points per game in sports
- Power play goal in ice hockey
