= Waldorf Music =

German synthesizer company

Waldorf Music is a German synthesizer company best known for its Microwave wavetable synthesizer and Blofeld virtual analogue synthesizer.

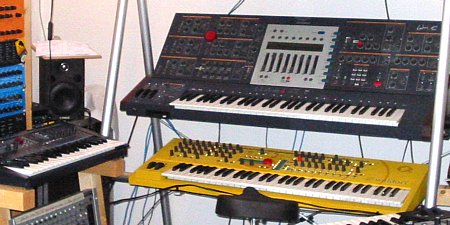
WAVE (1993) atop yellow Q (1999). MicroQ keyboard (2001) left

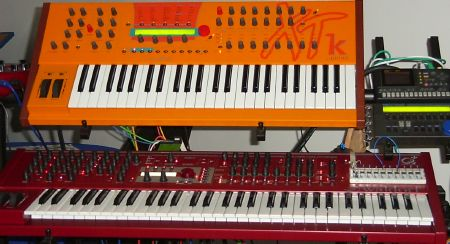
Waldorf XTk (1999) above Waldorf Q+ (2002, with some special made multiple memory card expansion)

== History ==
Waldorf Electronics GmbH was founded in 1988 by Wolfgang Düren, who was then the German distributor for PPG. The name "Waldorf" refers to the German town of Waldorf, located near Bonn, the former capital of West Germany, where the company was established. Later, the company was headquartered at Schloss Ahrenthal.

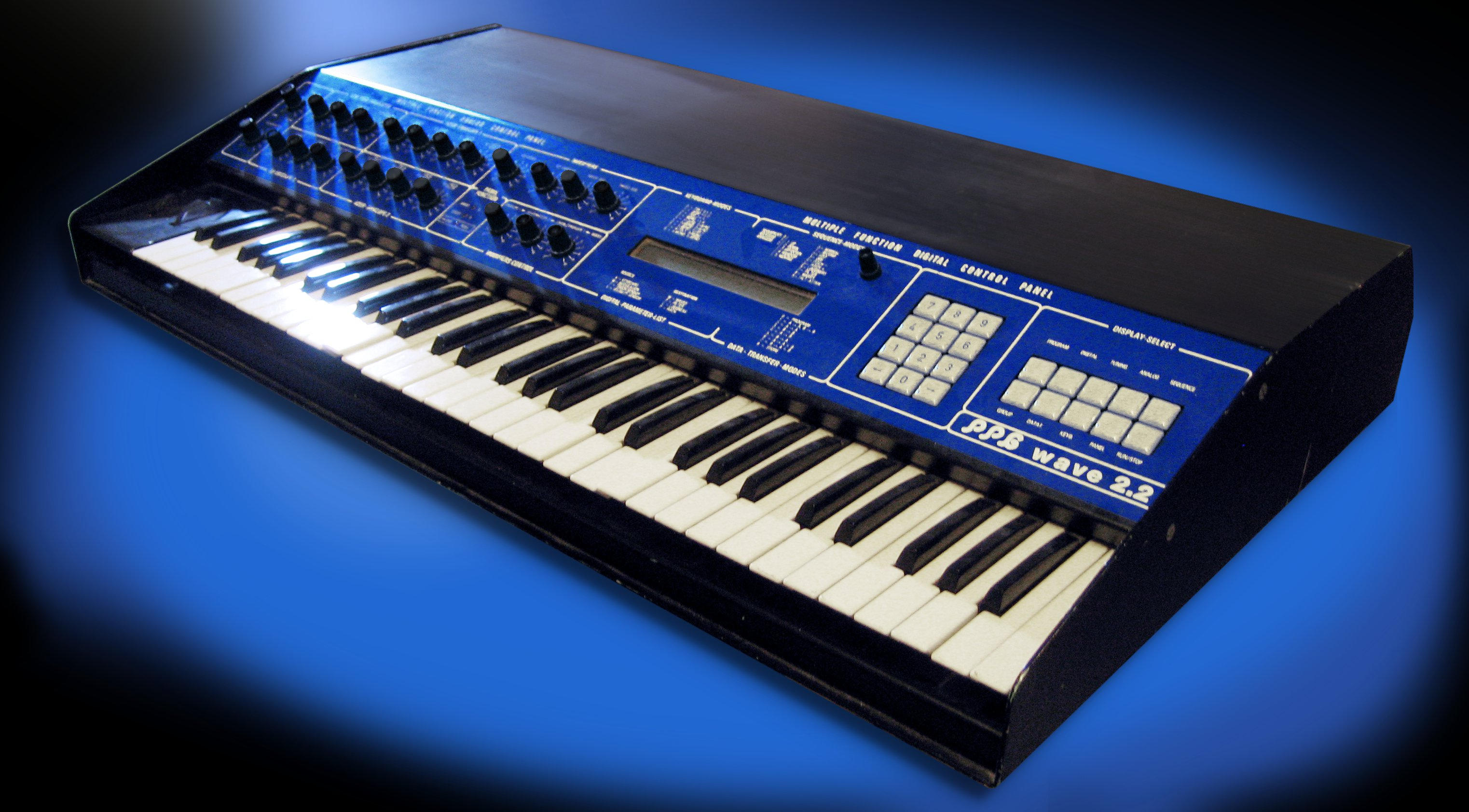
PPG Wave 2.x series (1981-1987), designed by Wolfgang Palm, was a predecessor of Waldorf The WAVE and Microwave.

After the demise of PPG in 1987, Waldorf carried forward the legacy of wavetable synthesis. Using an ASIC designed by Wolfgang Palm, the company developed the Microwave and later the WAVE synthesizers. However, Palm was never employed by Waldorf. The Microwave I, released in 1989, was based on ASICs and a Motorola MC68000 microprocessor. In contrast, the Microwave II, introduced in 1997, was powered by a DSP.

While many other synthesizer manufacturers focused on recreating existing hardware in software, Waldorf took a different approach. In 2002, they introduced the RackAttack, a hardware drum synthesizer, whose synth engine had been released as a VST instrument the year prior.

On 5 February 2004, Waldorf declared insolvency in a German court. Shortly before this, the company had been restructured into an Aktiengesellschaft (Waldorf Music AG), but the effort was unsuccessful.

In the summer of 2006, a new company, Waldorf Music GmbH, was officially established, though it is not a legal successor to the original company. Waldorf's headquarters have since moved to Remagen and are now led by CEO Joachim Flor.

In 2013, Waldorf released NAVE, a synthesizer app for iOS. Their Kyra synthesizer, launched in 2019, became the first fully FPGA-powered synthesizer. In 2014, Waldorf released the Streichfett, a synthesizer designed to recreate the sound of vintage string machines.

== Products ==
=== 1989 ===
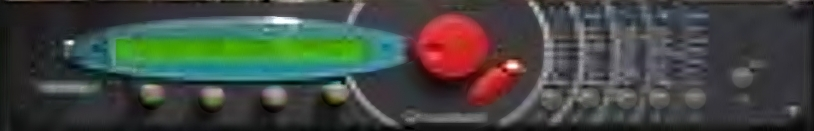
Waldorf Microwave II (1997-)

- Microwave: A rack-mounted wavetable synthesizer developed from the PPG Wave. It was produced in two hardware revisions: early models featured a backlit LCD, while later models used a lit character display. Both versions utilized different Curtis CEM analog low-pass filter chips. It was later referred to as the Microwave I following the release of the Microwave II in 1997.

=== 1990 ===
- Midibay MB-15: A rack-mounted MIDI patch bay and merger.

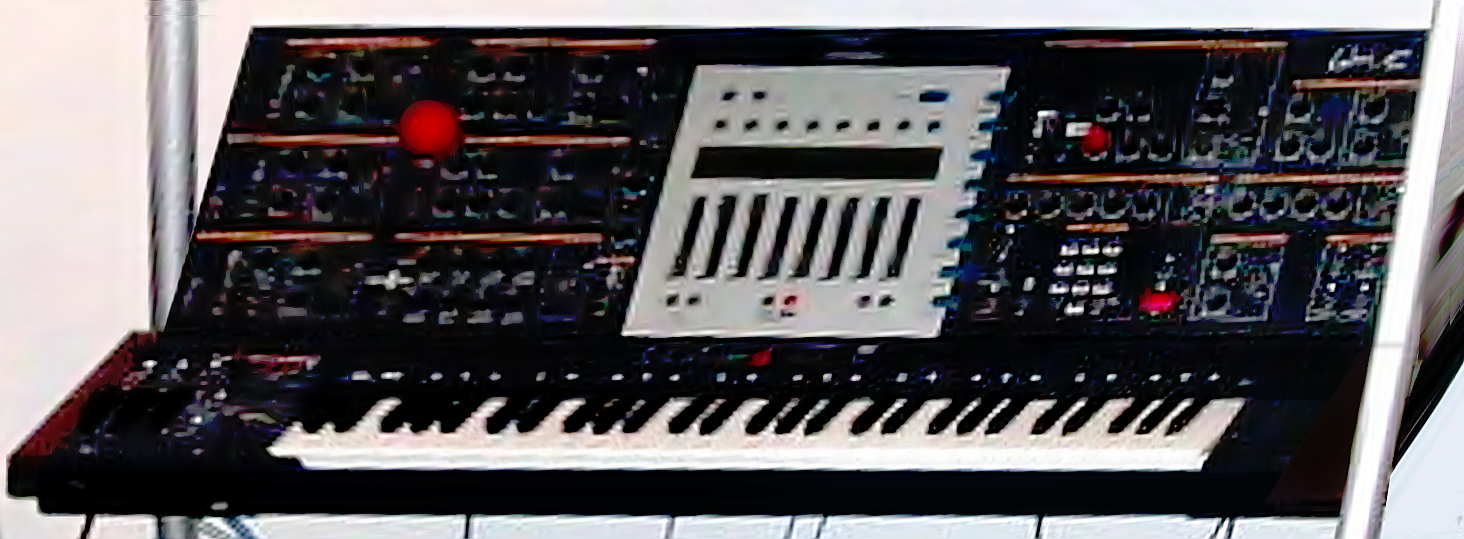
Waldorf WAVE (1993)

=== 1991 ===
- Microwave Waveslave: A 1U rack-mounted voice expansion module for the original Microwave, adding an additional 8 voices.

=== 1993 ===
- WAVE: A wavetable synthesizer, the WAVE was a deluxe extrapolation of Microwave technology, offering additional features for wavetable creation and resynthesis that remain unmatched by any other synthesizer to this day. It was available in four colors and with 61 or 76 keys, offering 16 voices in standard configuration, expandable to 32 or 48. Released in 1994 with a retail price of $9,000, around 320 units were produced, based on known serial numbers. The WAVE was used by artists such as Depeche Mode, Deep Forest, Enya, Hans Zimmer, and The Orb.
- 4-Pole: A tabletop analog filter box.
- EQ-27: A compact, tabletop, programmable, and MIDI-controllable stereo 7-band equalizer.

=== 1994 ===
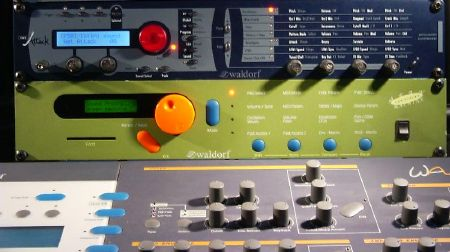
Waldorf rackAttack (2002) in the earlier blue/gray color combination above Waldorf 'Mean Green Machine Microwave I (1994). A bit of a WAVE (1993) panel is visible here too.

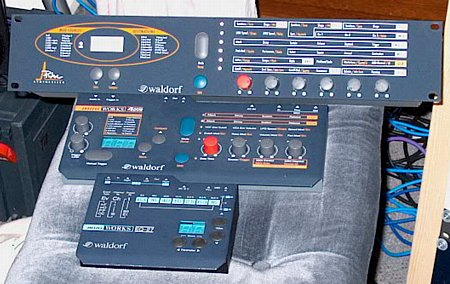
Pulse (1995) atop 4-pole (1993) atop EQ-27 (ca.1993)

- Microwave I V2.0: A ROM upgrade for the Microwave I that added additional wavetables, the ability to algorithmically create custom wavetables, a speech synthesizer, and numerous other improvements. The Waveslave was not compatible with this upgrade, but a trade-in program was offered, allowing users to upgrade to a full Microwave for a small fee.
- A limited edition Mean Green Machine was released alongside this upgrade. It was a Microwave with a new "Nextel" rubberized finish in green, a certificate of authenticity, special cone-shaped metal feet, and humorous silkscreening (the power switch was labeled "Life," and the card slot was labeled "Food"). From then on, standard Microwave units featured the Nextel finish in the usual blue color.

=== 1995 ===
- Gekko Chords and Gekko Trigger: Very compact, passively powered MIDI tools.
- Hohner Adam
- Pulse: A monophonic analog rack synthesizer.

=== 1997 ===
- Gekko Arpeggiator: A very compact, passively powered MIDI tool.
- Microwave II: A Motorola DSP-driven wavetable rack synthesizer, featuring many of the original Microwave's functions with improved mixing, modulation, effects processing, and a multimode filter.
- Pulse+: A monophonic analog rack synthesizer with additional audio input and MIDI / CV/gate interface.

=== 1998 ===
- x-pole: A programmable stereo (in/out) analog filter in a 2U rack module, with full MIDI, CV/Gate, and ACM support.
- Microwave XT: A Microwave II with 44 knobs and audio input, housed in a 5U package with a bright orange color.
- Microwave XT Limited Edition: A Microwave XT in a charcoal gray/black color scheme, released in a limited edition of 666 units.
- d-pole: A VST filter plug-in.
- Terratec Microwave PC: A synthesizer module for the TerraTec EWS sound cards, featuring a fully functional Microwave II in a drive bay package.
- Wavetable Oscillator for Creamware Modular: A wavetable oscillator module for the Creamware Modular synthesizer system.

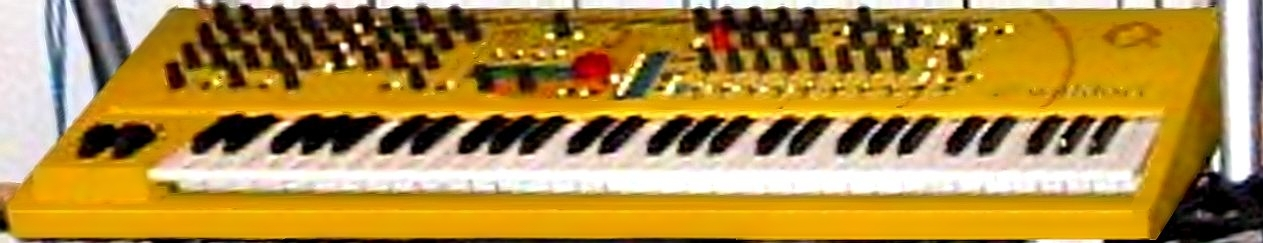
Waldorf yellow Q (1999)

=== 1999 ===
- Q: A DSP-driven virtual analog synthesizer with 58 knobs. Available in bright yellow "Sahara" and WAVE blue, the latter becoming popularly known as the Halloween edition.
- XTk: The Microwave XT with a 49-key keyboard.
- Q rack: A rack-mounted version of the Q synth with fewer knobs, available in yellow and dark blue.

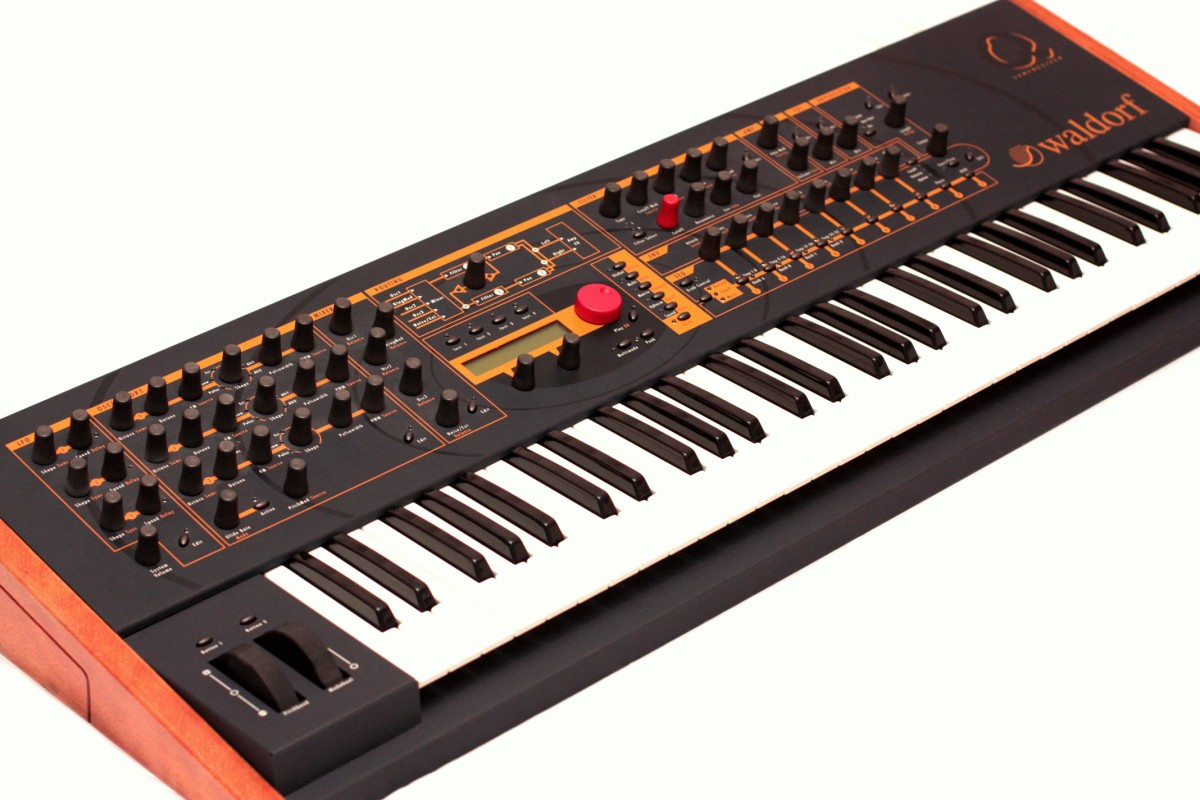
Waldorf Q Halloween version

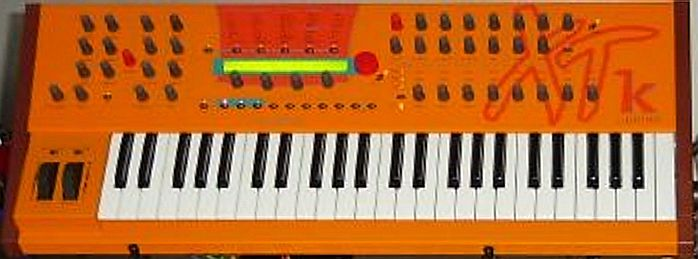
Waldorf Microwave XTk (1999)

=== 2000 ===
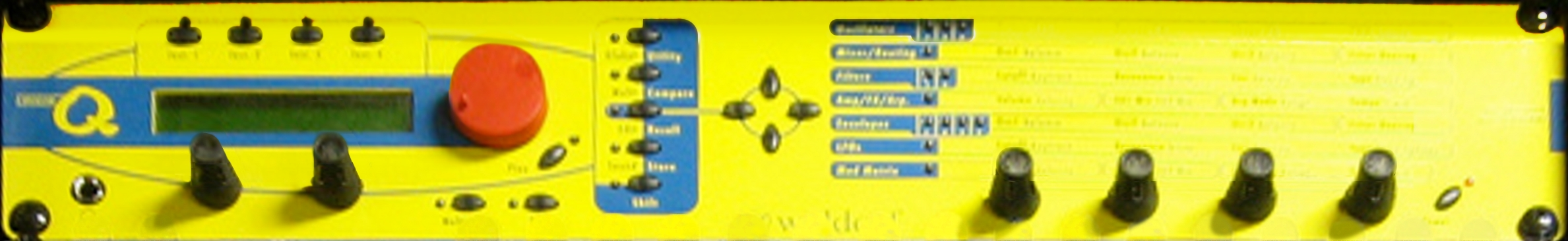
Waldorf microQ yellow (ca.2000)

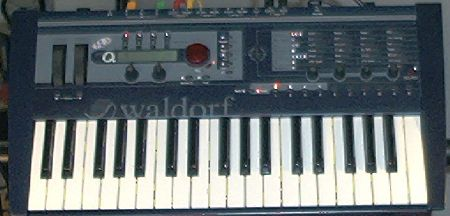
Waldorf microQ keyboard (2001)

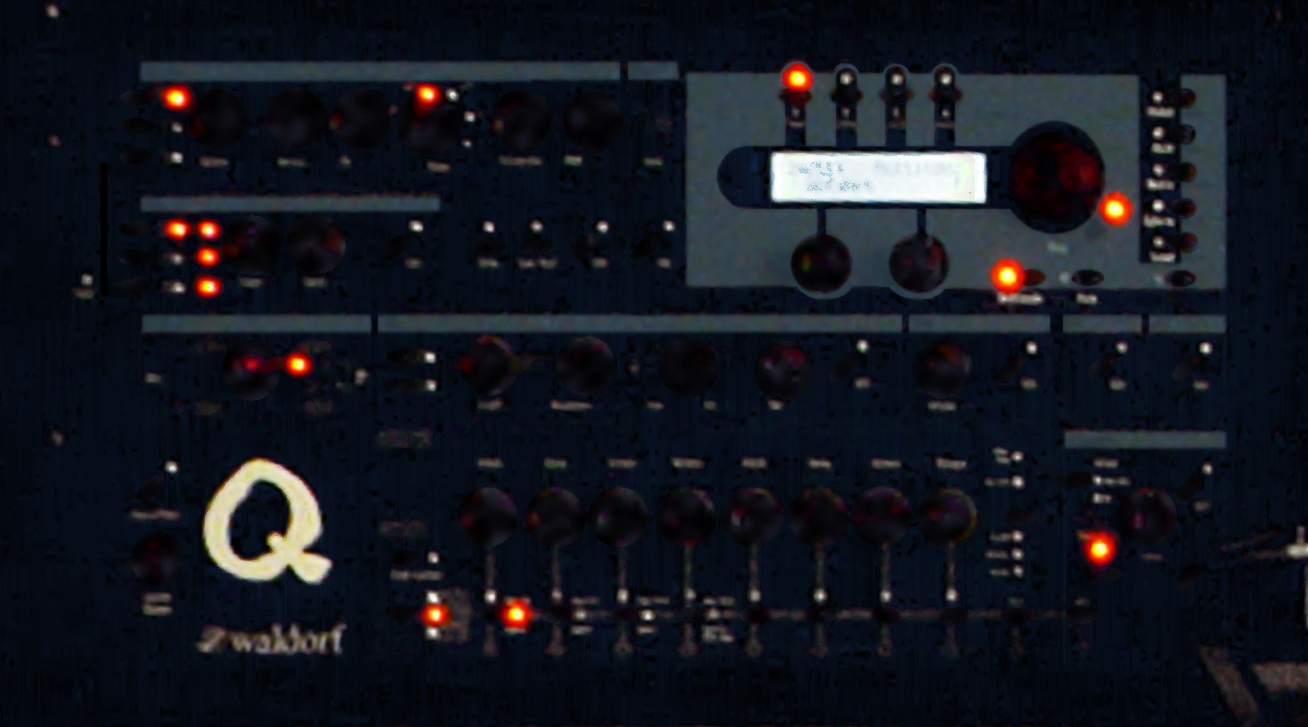
Waldorf Q rack blue (1999/2001)

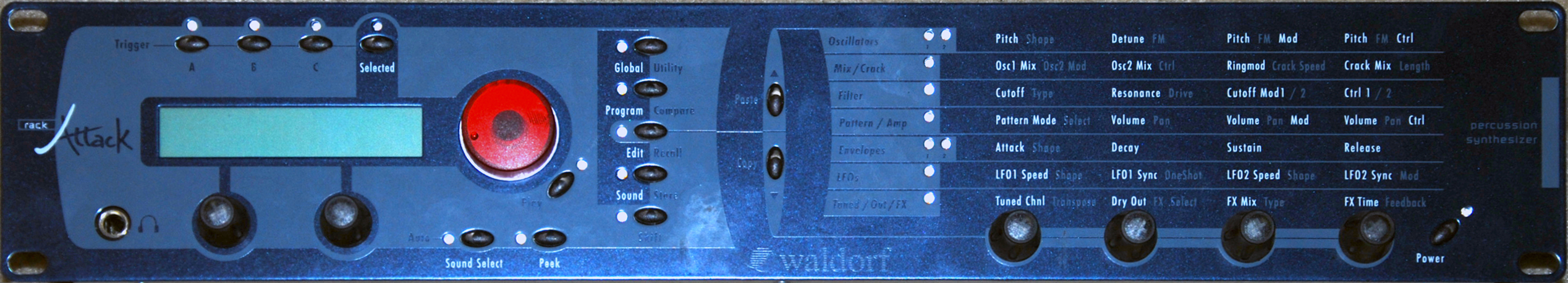
Waldorf RackAttack (2002)

- PPG 2.V: A VST plug-in synthesizer designed to emulate the blue PPG Wave 2.x wavetable synthesizers.
- microQ: An even more compact and affordable version of the Q Rack, featuring only 7 knobs and a different DSP. It offers 25 potential voices compared to the original models, due to the shared operation and effects chip. A 75-voice expansion is available, though the upgrade must be performed by Waldorf or a licensed repair center. The typical usage depends on the complexity of patches, unlike the Q or Q Rack, which feature 16-note polyphony, upgradeable to 32 voices. The microQ does not include the step sequencer.

=== 2001 ===
- Attack: A VST drum-synth plug-in.
- The color of the Q, Q Rack, and microQ was changed to the classic (Microwave) blue.
- microQ keyboard: A 3-octave keyboard version of the microQ, in classic blue.

=== 2002 ===
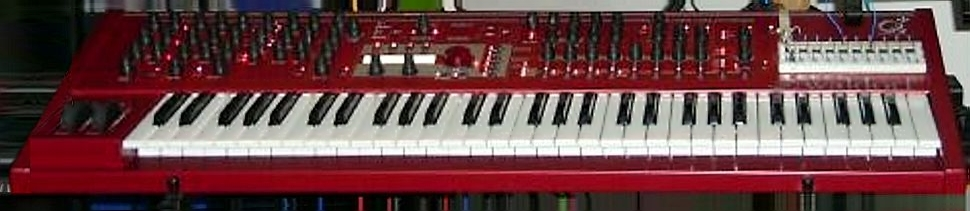
Waldorf Q+ (2002, with some special made multiple memory card expansion)

- D-coder: A synth and vocoder plug-in for the TC PowerCore hardware platform.
- RackAttack: A VST housed in a microQ casing.
- Q+: A red Q model featuring up to 100 dynamically allocated voices and 16 analog low-pass filters.
- A1: A VSTi software synthesizer for Steinberg Cubase SX and Nuendo.
- Waldorf Filter for Halion: A filter plug-in for Steinberg's Halion sampler.

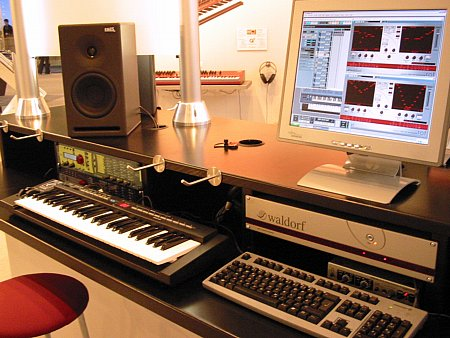
Musik Messe 2003: PC running ROT Analog Filter Step Sequencer. AFB-16 (2003) below. rackAttack (2002, here in the later color combination of blue/yellow) and microQ (2000, classic blue) below the speaker on the left. Q+ (2002) in the background

=== 2003 ===
- AFB-16: A unit with 16 analog filters, designed for use via USB with VST instruments and effects.

=== 2004 ===
- On 5 February, Waldorf Music AG declared insolvency in a German court.

=== 2006 ===
- In April 2006, Waldorf Music GmbH was formed. Despite the website experiencing intermittent availability in August of the same year, leading to multiple pronouncements of its demise, the Waldorf user mailing list/forum was resurrected in November.

=== 2007 ===
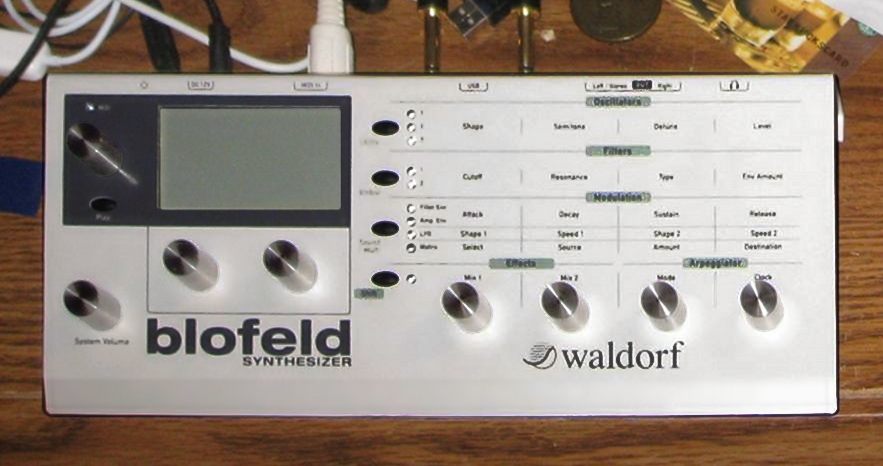
Waldorf Blofeld (2007)

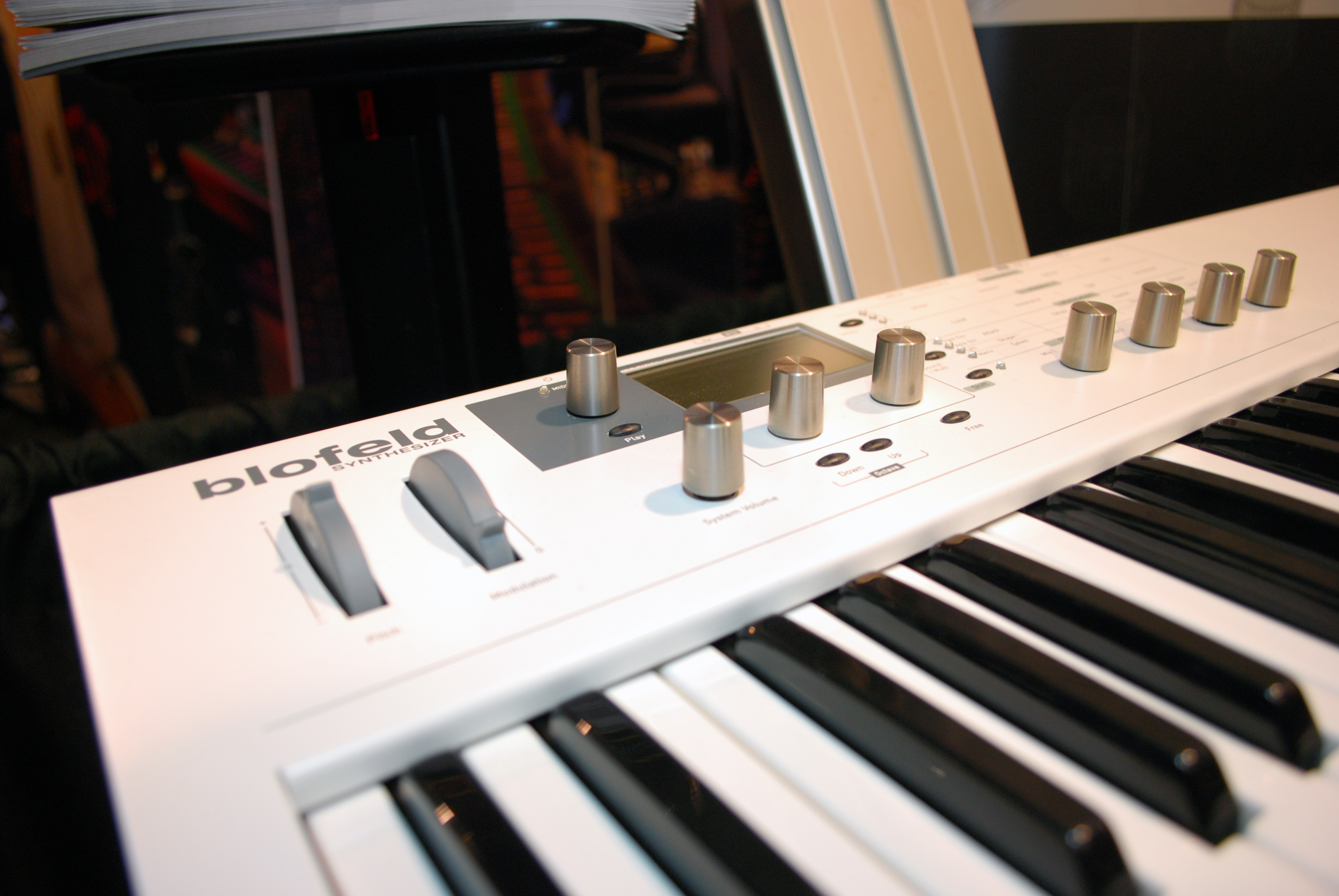
Waldorf Blofeld keyboard (2009)

- Blofeld (released December 2007): It is an affordable desktop module that combines the sound engines of the Q and the Microwave. Blofeld is still in production today (as of 2025).
- At the start of 2007, Waldorf announced their new line of synthesizers and electric pianos. This included special editions of their famed Q, Q+, and Micro Q models, rebranded as the Phoenix Edition, along with the introduction of Blofeld. Additionally, a design study called Stromberg was shown, but it never went into production.

=== 2009 ===
- Blofeld Keyboard (released January 2009): The Blofeld Keyboard is a Blofeld housed in a compact metal case, featuring a four-octave semi-weighted keyboard and 60 MB of sample memory, in addition to the Blofeld module.
- License SL: The Blofeld License SL Sample Upgrade is a software license that expands the Waldorf Blofeld desktop module with an additional 60 MB of sample memory.
- Largo: A software synthesizer that functions as a VST and AudioUnit instrument.

=== 2010 ===
- PPG Wave 3.V (released December 2010): A software version of the PPG Wave keyboards, functioning as a VST and AudioUnit instrument.

=== 2011 ===
- Lector: A software vocoder that functions as a VST and AudioUnit plugin.

=== 2012 ===
- Zarenbourg: An electric piano based on physical modelling and samples.

=== 2013 ===
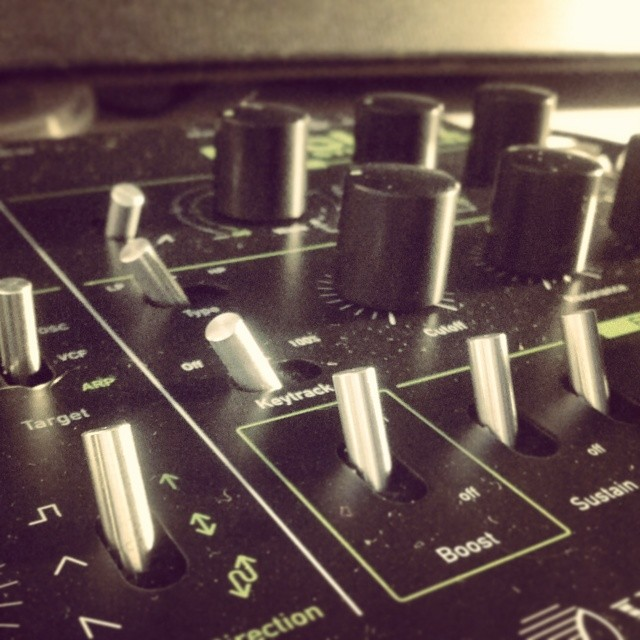
Waldorf Rocket (2013)

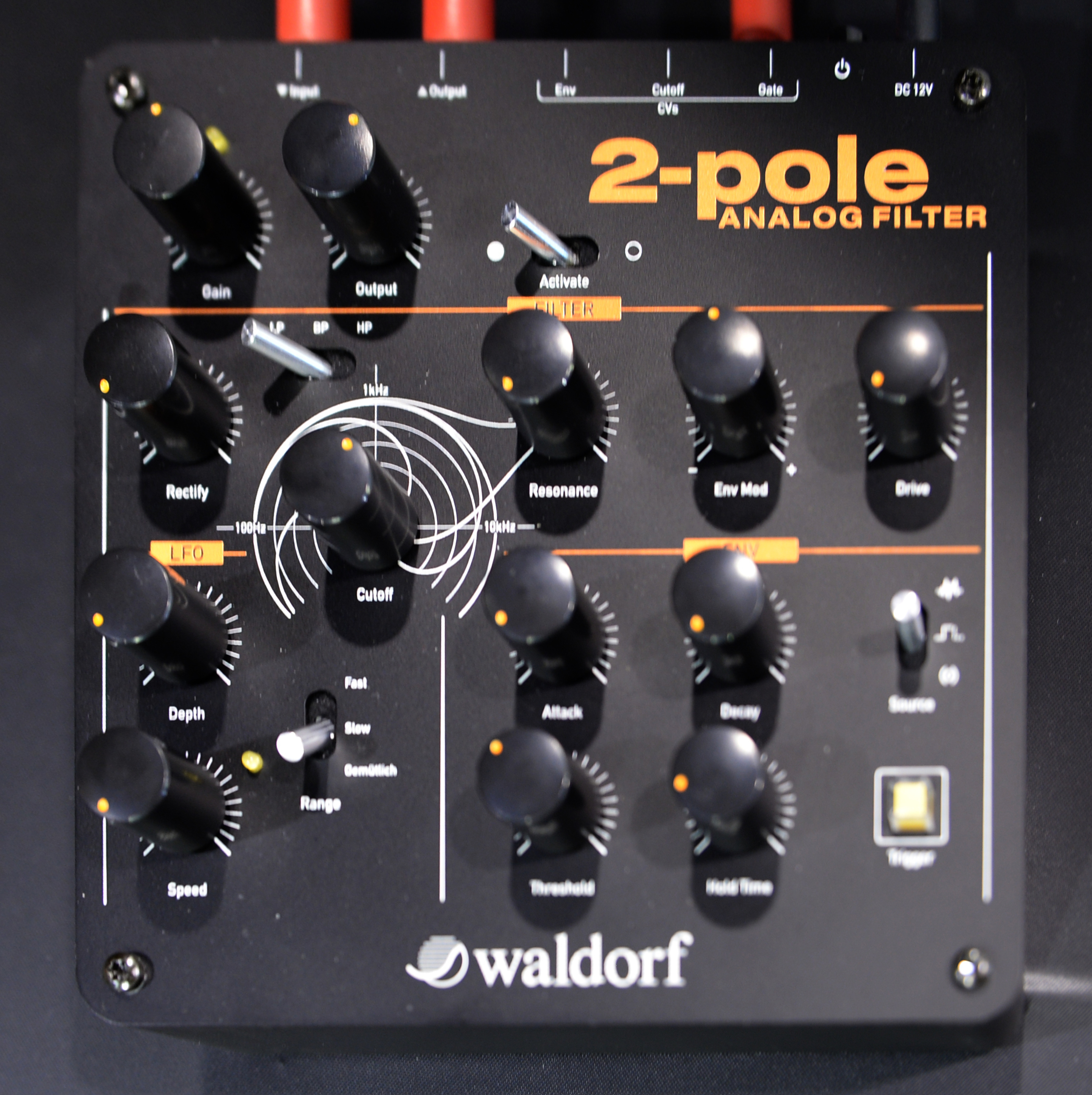
Waldorf 2-Pole Analog Filter (2014)

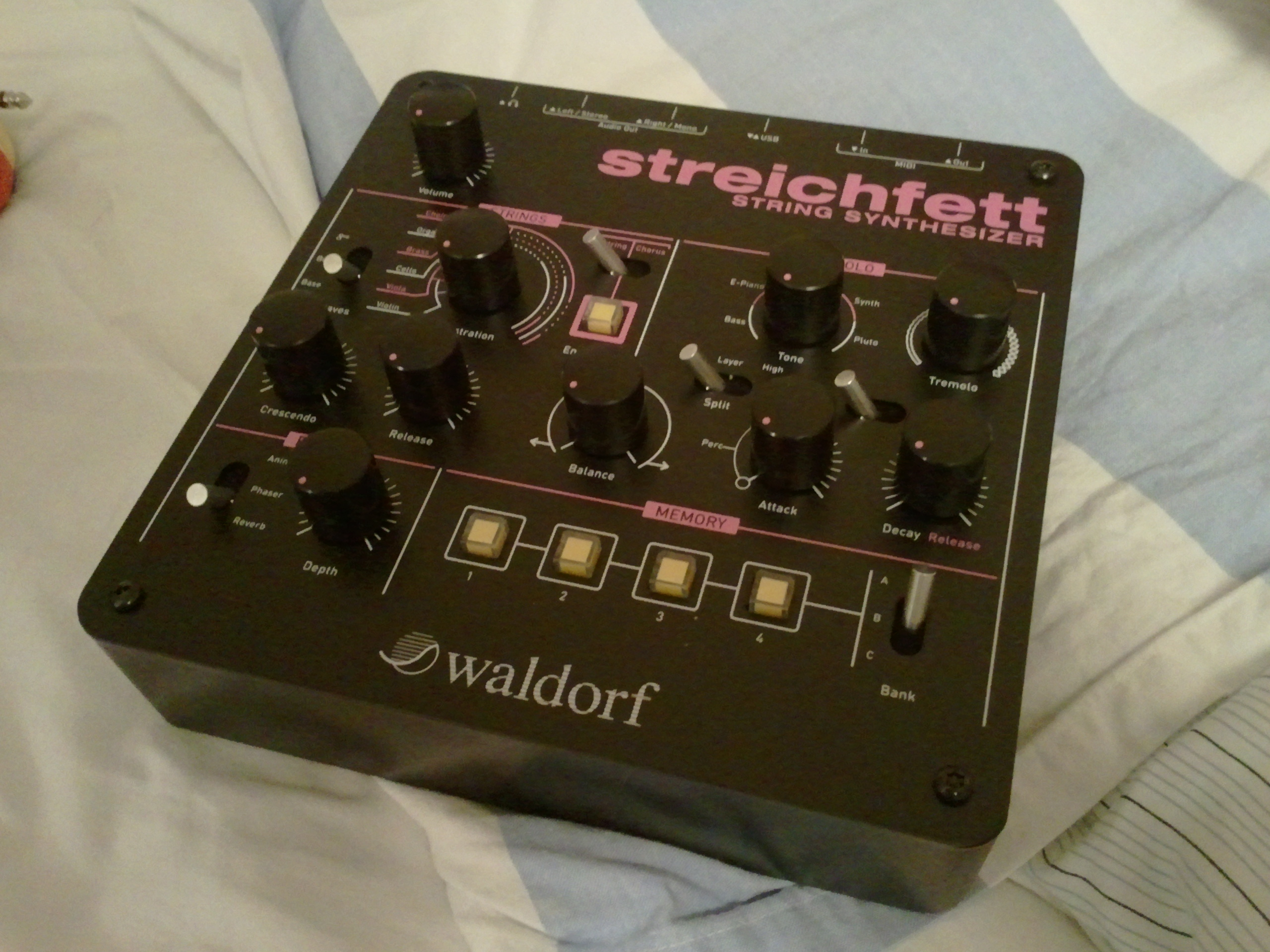
Waldorf Streichfett (2014) string synthesizer

- Rocket: A paraphonic hybrid synthesizer.
- Nave: A wavetable synthesizer for the iPad.
- Pulse 2: A paraphonic analog synthesizer.

=== 2014 ===
- 2-Pole: An analog filter.
- Streichfett: A string synthesizer.

=== 2015 ===
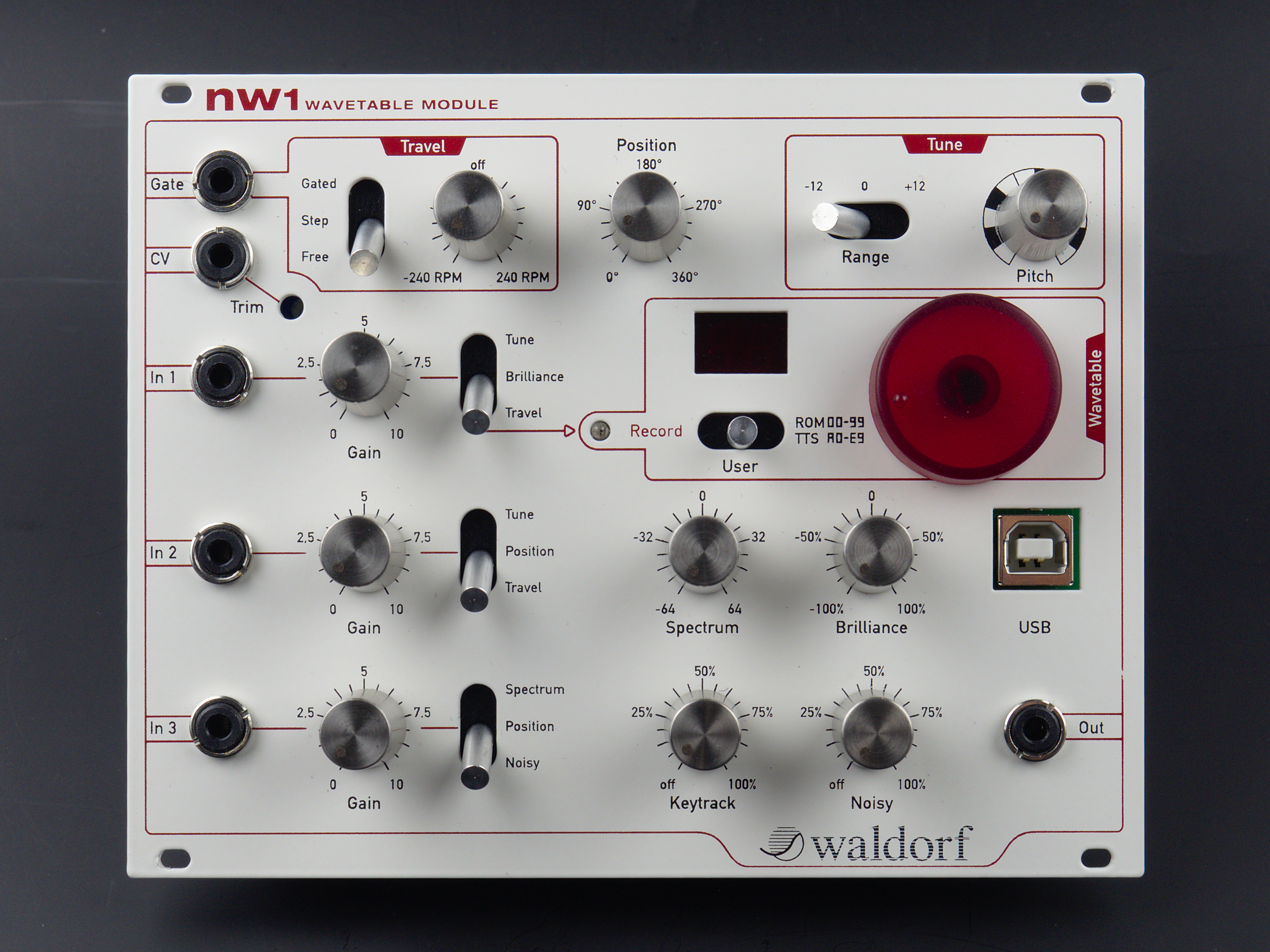
Waldorf nw1 (2015)

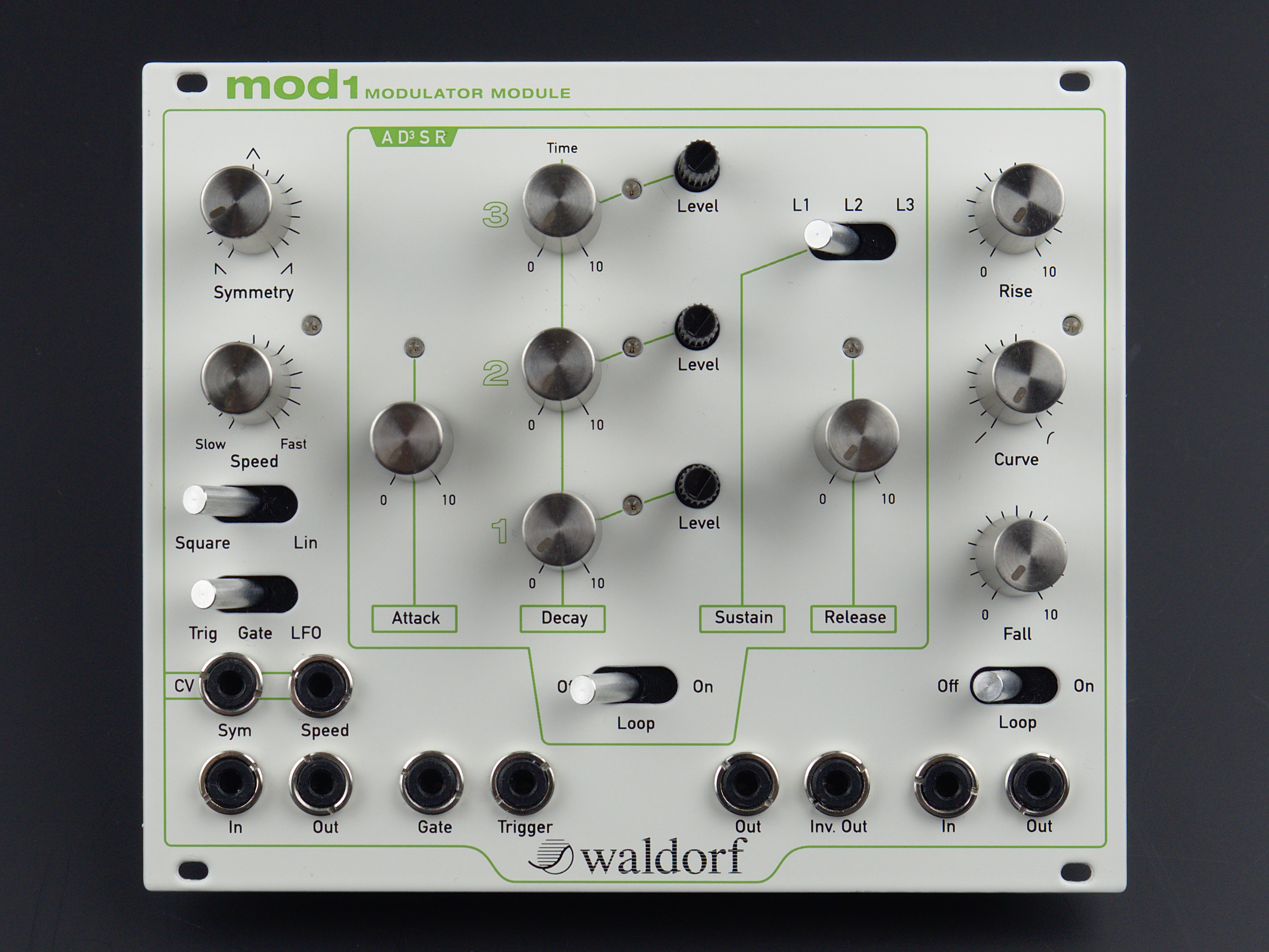
Waldorf mod1 (2016)

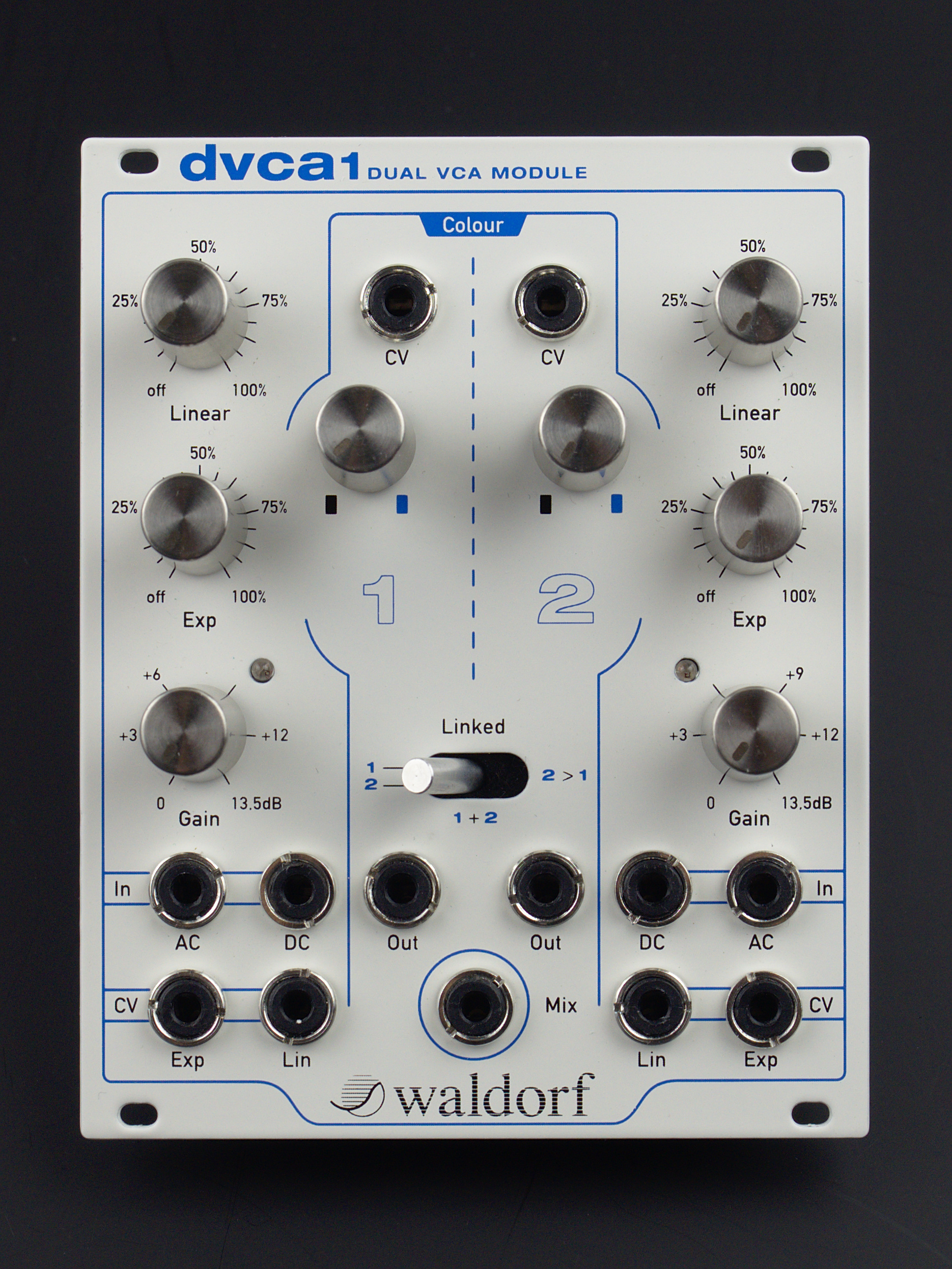
Waldorf dvca1 (2016)

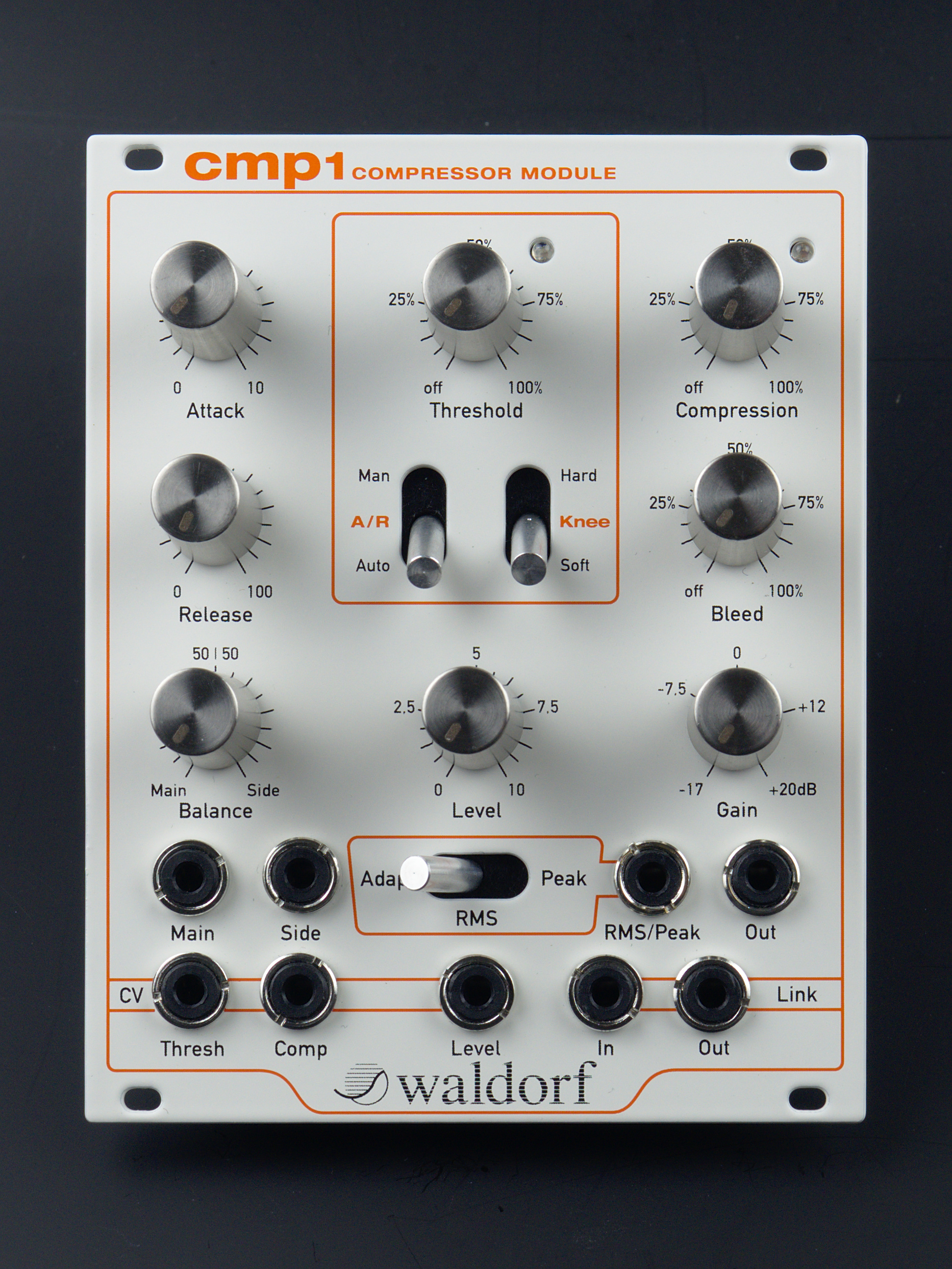
Waldorf cmp1 (2016)

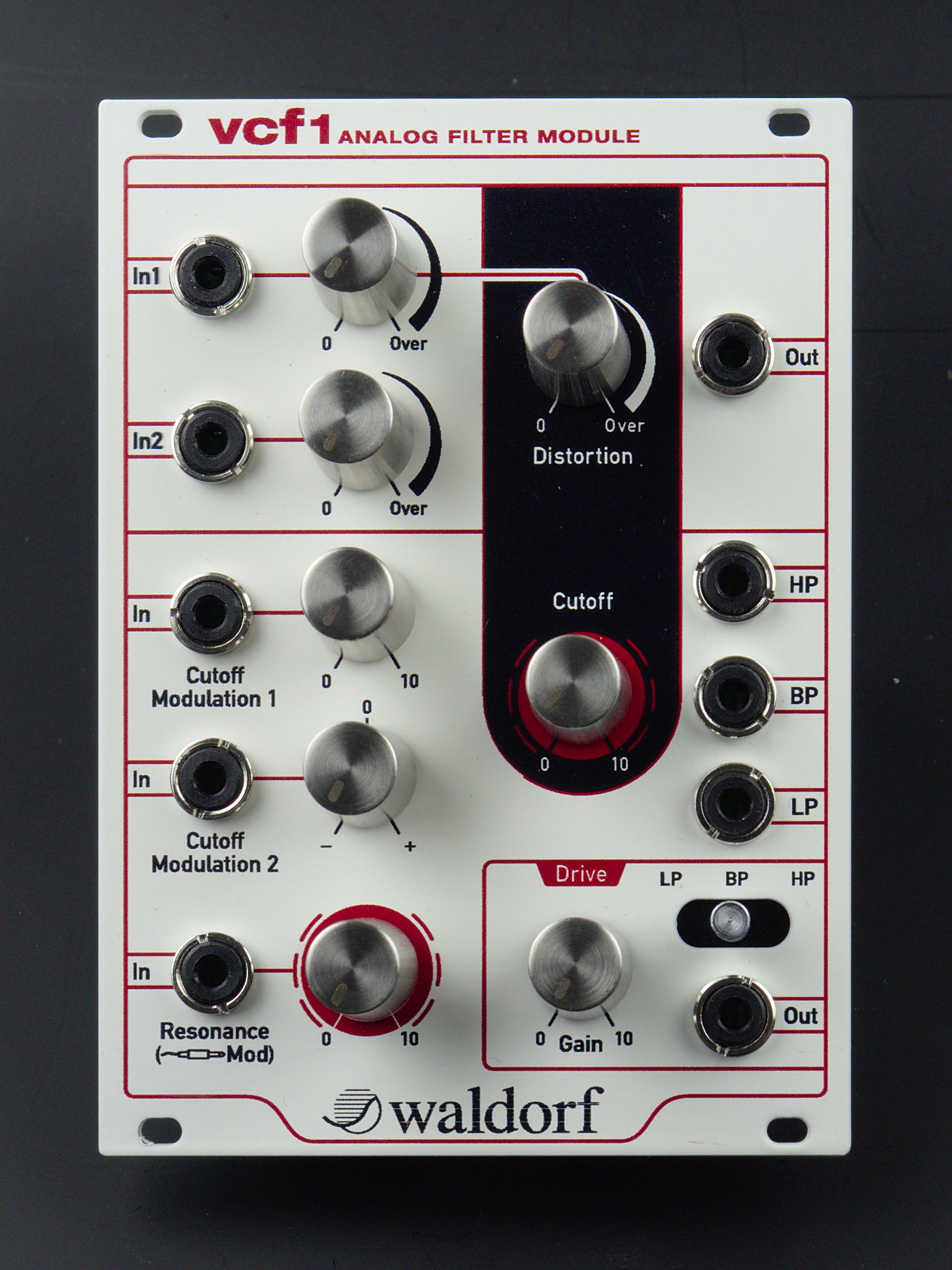
Waldorf vcf1 (2017)

- nw1 Eurorack Wavetable Oscillator: A digital wavetable oscillator designed for use in the Eurorack modular system.

=== 2016 ===
- kb37 Eurorack: A Eurorack-based modular synthesis system that includes a 37-key keyboard and a mounting surface for modules up to 107 hp.
- mod1: A Eurorack-based analog synthesis module offering three types of modulation parameters.
- dvca1: A Eurorack-based analog dual VCA circuit with input summing and parallel control of separate parameters.
- cmp1: A Eurorack-based analog compressor module offering both RMS and peak modes of operation.

=== 2017 ===
- vcf1: A Eurorack-based analog multimode filter module with distortion.

=== 2018 ===
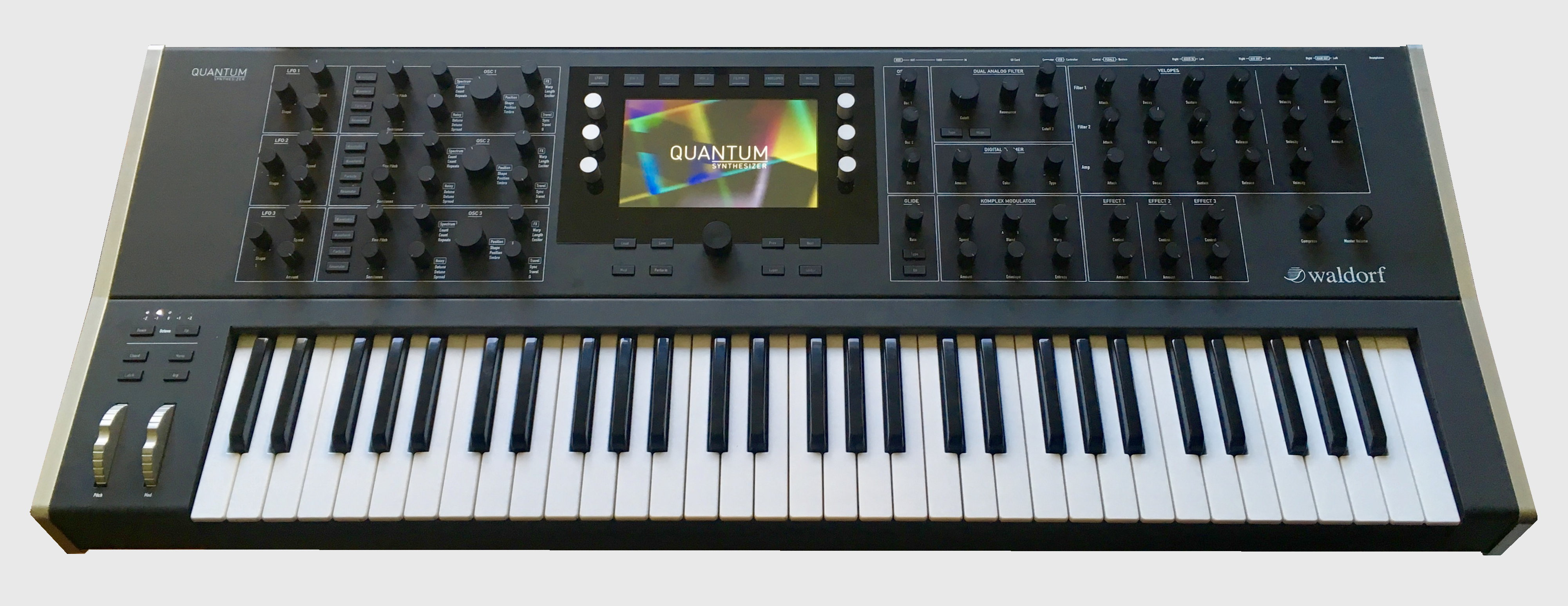
Waldorf Quantum Synthesizer

- Quantum: Waldorf's flagship analog/digital hybrid synthesizer.

=== 2019 ===
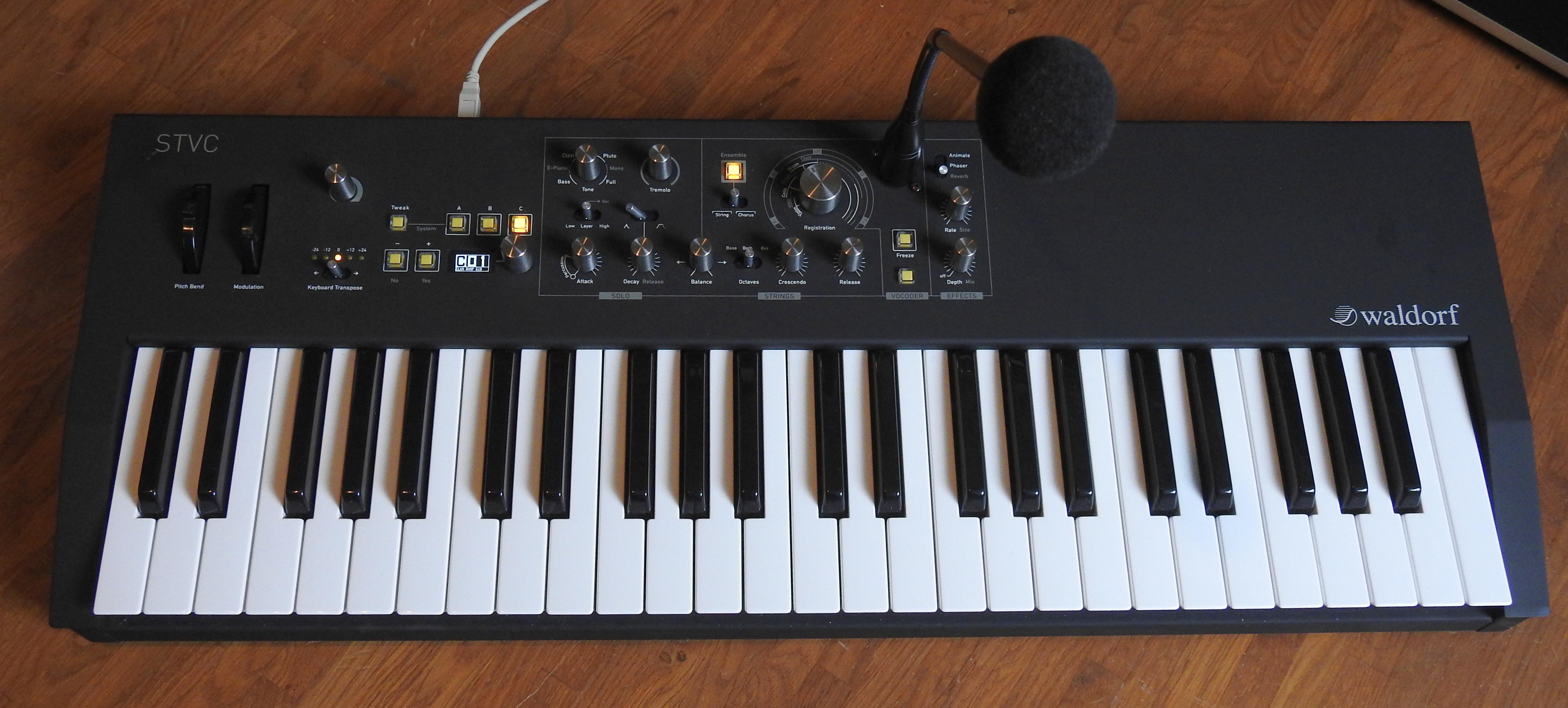
Waldorf STVC

- STVC: The keyboard version of the Streichfett, with an added vocoder and additional tweaking parameters. Released in small numbers in the summer of 2019, followed by a general release in 2020.
- Kyra: The world's first fully FPGA-powered synthesizer, featuring 128 voices.

=== 2020 ===
- Iridium: A digital 16-voice dual-timbral polyphonic synthesizer module with 3 stereo digital oscillators, dual filters, 6 LFOs, 6 envelopes, and a modulation matrix.

=== 2021 ===
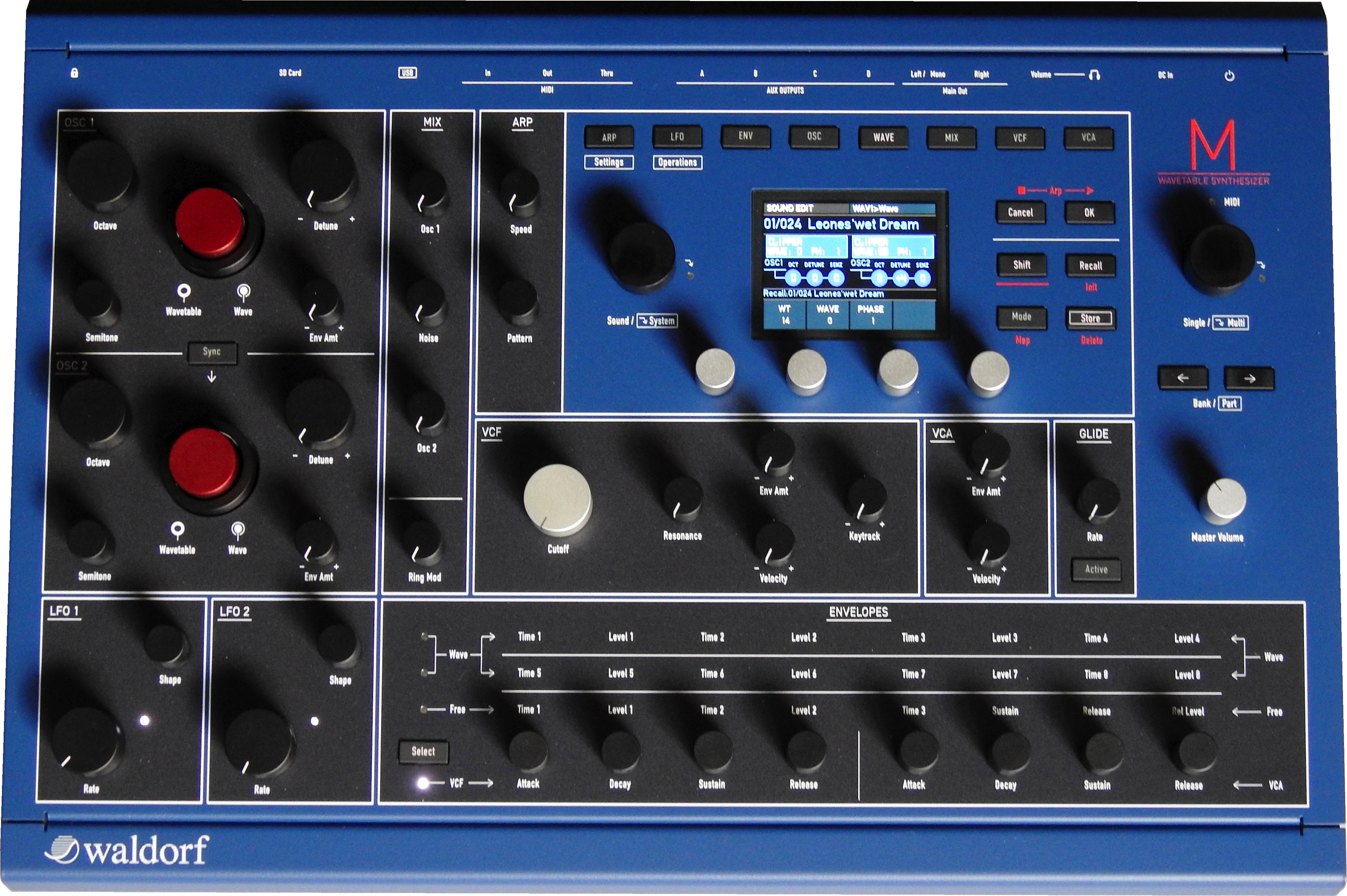
Waldorf M

- M: A hybrid 8-voice polyphonic synthesizer module with 2 digital wavetable oscillators recreating the Microwave sound character, an analog SSI filter, 2 LFOs, 4 envelopes, user wavetable import, and SD card mass storage.

=== 2022 ===
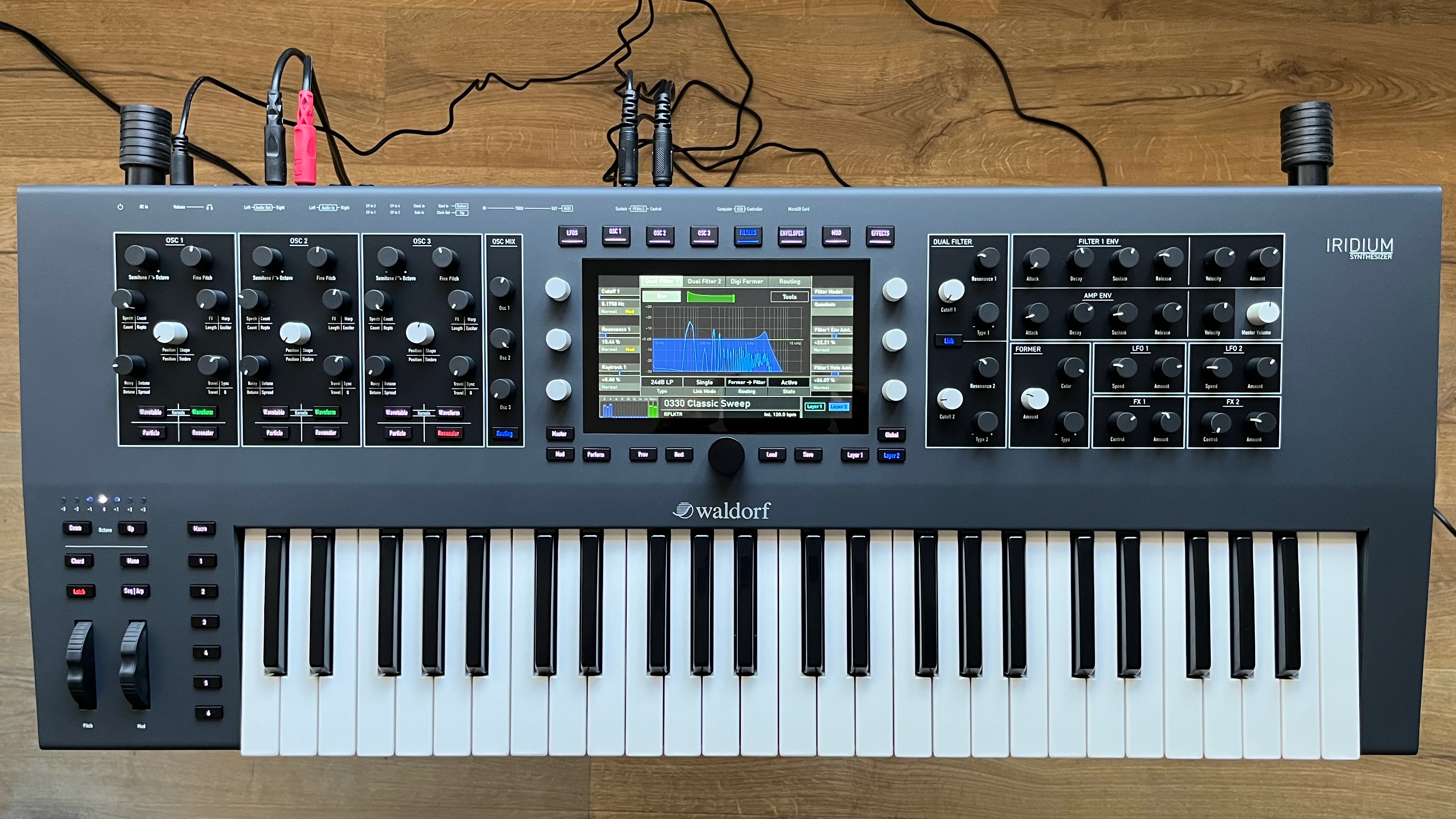
Waldorf Iridium Keyboard

- Iridium Keyboard: A variant of the Iridium, housed in a case with a 49-key Fatar TP/8SK semi-weighted polyphonic aftertouch keyboard. The layout of the physical controls is similar to the module version of Iridium, with more space between knobs and buttons. It also features additional dedicated controls for envelopes, LFOs, FX, and layer selection, as well as six macro buttons.

=== 2023 ===
- Quantum MK2: A new version of the Quantum MK1, featuring several new features, such as a polyphonic aftertouch-capable keyboard.

=== Distributed products ===
- Emes Studio Monitors

=== Developed for Steinberg ===
- SMP 24 (for Atari ST)
- SMP II (for Atari ST)
- Midex+ (for Atari ST)
- Topaz (Harddisk recording, Mr. Wolfgang Palm was involved too)

== Notable users of Waldorf gear ==
- Jean-Michel Jarre
- Vangelis
- Hans Zimmer
- Enya
- A-ha
- Depeche Mode
- Justice on album with Tame impala
- The Orb
- Nine Inch Nails
- Björk
- Albert Patron
- Stafford Bawler
