= PPG Phonem =

Vocal synthesizer plugin

- PPG Phonem interface
- Developer(s): Wolfgang Palm
- Initial release: 2015; 10 years ago
- Available in: English, German and French
- Type: Voice synthesizer
- License: Proprietary
- Website: www.wolfgangpalm.com/phonem.html

PPG Phonem is a vocal synthesizer VST/AU plugin.

== About ==
PPG Phonem was originally designed to do just vocal synthesis, though it is capable of acting as a universal sound synthesizer. It has 12 individual resonators which all impact the sound output .It organizes sound at the level of the individual phoneme and strings phonemes together, every phoneme within can be adjusted to alter the result. As a result, it is possible to create the phonetic sounds for any language, though is limited by the users knowledge of the phonemes required. It comes ready capable of creating American English, German and French using a simple dictionary and has 2 females and 4 male vocals plus synthetic textures. The software is capable of producing a range of human noises such as whispering or roaring or create inhuman sounds such as bass plucks.

== Reception ==
Bedroom Producers Blog reviewer "D Smolken" rates Phonem "Brilliant", giving 5 stars for performance, 4.5 stars for features, design, sound and price, and 4 stars for workflow. The review stated that Phonem "provide(s) an enormous amount of control over every detail of the sound and the flexibility to whisper, speak, sing, growl, roar, and even make sounds which are not human at all, but very reminiscent of classic synthesizers", "puts a serious amount of power at your fingertips, even by the standards of non-vocal synthesizers. While other vocal synthesizers make it seem like you’re telling a robot what to sing and how, Phonem feels more like you’re inside the robot controlling every detail of what its robotic vocal tract does. It’s very scientific, in a mad scientist way", and "Phonem is very powerful and provides a level of control that no other vocal synthesizer does." D SMOLKEN noted in their final verdict noted that "Phonem is best at synthesizing abstract weirdness" and concluded that the synthesizer was a powerful tool with editing at a level that no other synthesizer offered.
