= Palm Products GmbH =

German electronic musical instrument manufacturer

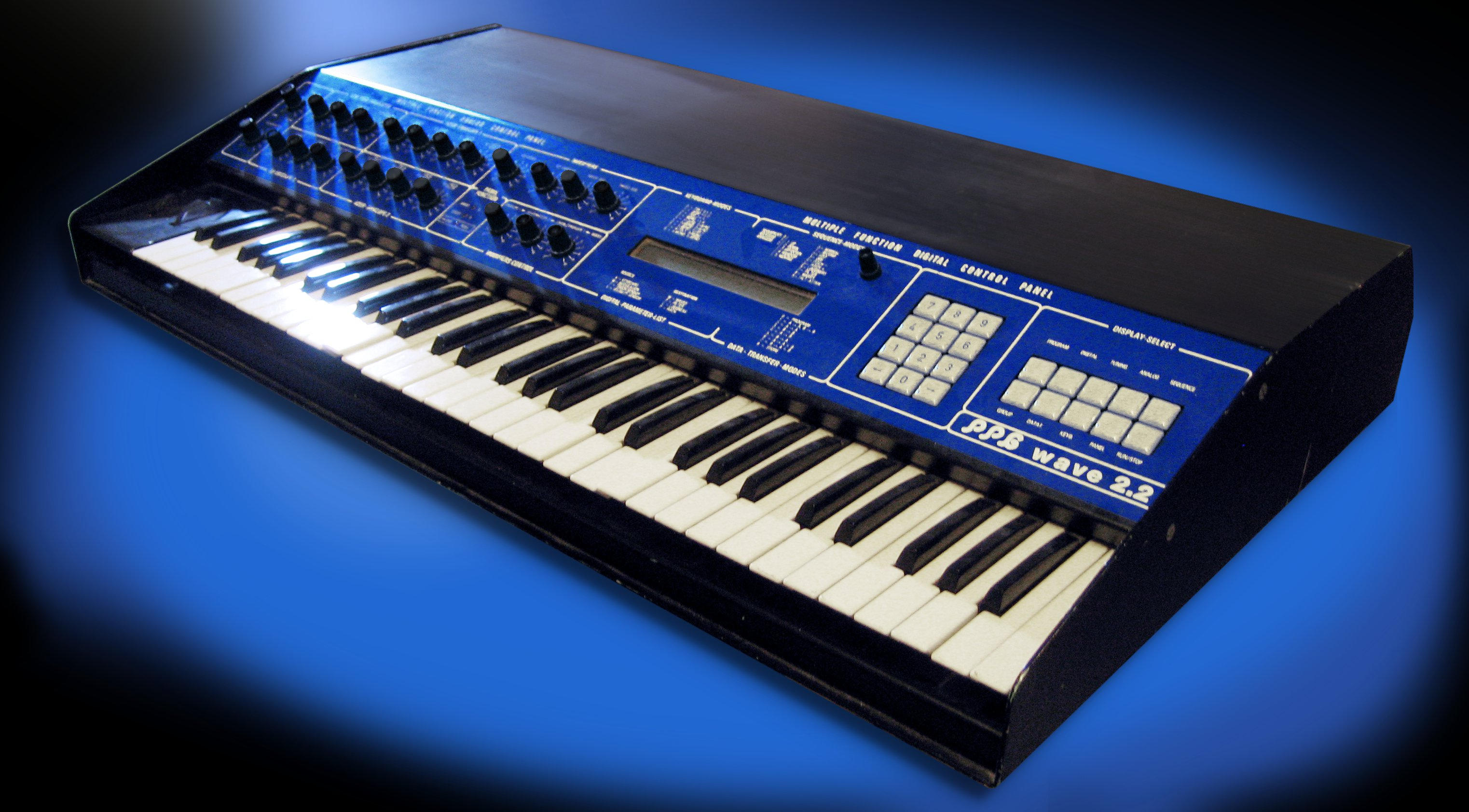
The Wave, designed by Wolfgang Palm, was PPG's most successful and well-known product

Palm Products GmbH (commonly abbreviated to PPG) was a manufacturer of audio synthesizers. Founded and owned by Wolfgang Palm, PPG was located in Hamburg, Germany and, for 12 years from around 1975 to 1987, manufactured an acclaimed and eclectic range of electronic musical instruments, all designed by Palm.

== Beginnings ==
Wolfgang Palm was active as a keyboardist in bands in the Hamburg area before becoming aware of the then-burgeoning synthesizer market. Palm started his company in 1975.

Although he had reportedly built many synthesizers on his own, his first commercially available synthesizer was a modular synthesizer, dubbed the 300 Series, which, despite being fairly sophisticated, failed to sell in large quantities. Motivated by his failure and inspired by the design of the popular Minimoog, Palm introduced the 1002 and 1020 synthesizers. Both were portable, analog, monophonic, and relatively compact. The 1002 used voltage-controlled oscillators; however, the 1020 was revolutionary in its implementation of digitally controlled oscillators, which were much more stable and had a distinctive sound that later became PPG's trademark.

== The Wave ==
In 1979, Wolfgang Palm introduced a new concept, dubbed "wavetable synthesis". Wavetable synthesis allowed for the storage of short samples of a larger soundwave into individual slots of a “wavetable” that was stored in the memory of the system. The first PPG synthesizer to implement wavetable synthesis was the Wave Computer 360. It provided 8 voice polyphony and a choice of 9 polyphony modes allowing to stack its voices with two different sets of preset parameters. The PPG 360 is a hybrid synthesizer. Each of the Wave Computer's digital 8-bit oscillators is tuned by its own analog VCO and followed by a discrete analog tracking lowpass filter and an analog VCA. This mixture of early digital and late 1970s analog technology design gives the Wave Computer a very distinct digital yet smooth and pleasing sound. Only about 40 Wave Computers were produced and sold mainly to German and European customers before its successor, the Wave 2 was introduced 1981. Due to the rarity of the PPG 360 Wave Computer, false information about a 4 voice version and "harsh and tinny" sound circulate. The lack of broader success was due to the Wave Computer's radically new concept, apparent lack of a filter, relatively high price tag of 9,000.- German Marks and no international distributor.

Shortly after releasing the Wave Computer 360, in late 1979, PPG introduced the 340/380 System, a complex digital synthesizer workstation which consisted of the 340 Processor Unit, the 340 Generator Unit (featuring the PPG 360's voice cards), and the 380 Event Generator (a 16-track sequencer). It also came with a "Computer Terminal" which included a monitor, 8-inch floppy disk drives, and a 5 octave keyboard used for manual playing of events into the sequencer and for polyphonic playing with the 340 Wave Generator). Despite its own shortcomings, which included its complex functionality and its high price, it received publicity when it was used by Tangerine Dream and Thomas Dolby during the early 1980s.

PPG soon found more success with the release of the Wave 2, which debuted in 1981, priced at around US$10,000 (GB£5,500). It contained analog envelopes, LFOs and filters, combined with digital wavetable oscillators in a "hybrid" configuration. Whereas traditional analog synthesizers were only capable of 5 or 6 waveforms per oscillator, the PPG Wave 2 offered for each oscillator 64 selectable waveforms available from 30 individual wavetables. There were a total of 1,920 waveforms per oscillator available for use. As with the Wave Computer, Tangerine Dream helped with developing the synthesizer. A third envelope, front panel controls and resonance were added to the analog VCF in order to satisfy customer demands for a more classical analog synth feature set that was marketed by PPG as offering "the best of both worlds".

In total, around 1,000 Waves were manufactured between 1979 and 1987 with two different updates to the model: the PPG Wave 2.2, which added more waveforms and samples, and the 2.3, which added multitimbrality and MIDI. It was the most successful product PPG manufactured. The PPG Wave has been used by artists such as David Bowie, The Fixx, Thomas Dolby, Depeche Mode, Art of Noise, The Cars, Jean Michel Jarre, Pet Shop Boys, Rush, Gary Numan, Robert Palmer, Costin Miereanu, The Psychedelic Furs, Talk Talk, Tangerine Dream, Tears For Fears, Ultravox, Steve Winwood, Stevie Wonder, and many others.

== Computer-controlled synthesizers and the Realizer ==
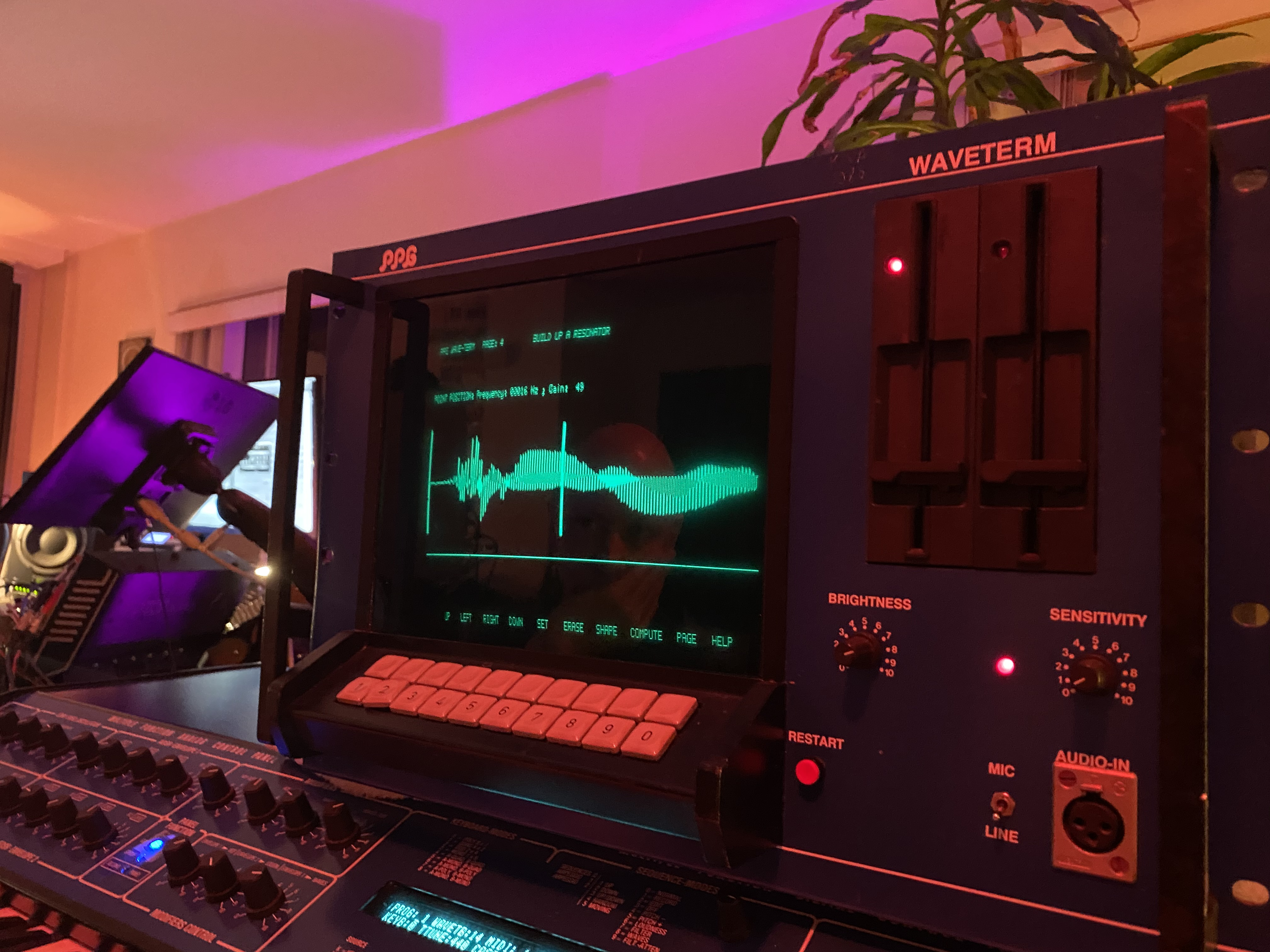
PPG Waveterm at Peter Freeman's studio

By 1982, Wolfgang Palm was set on introducing computers to music with the Waveterm, a rack-mounted computer system with a built-in monitor, two 8-inch floppy drives (later upgraded to 5.25-inch), and a proprietary Flex9-based operating system running on a Eurocom II motherboard created by the German company Eltec. In the Waveterm B, this was replaced by a proprietary Motorola 68000-based motherboard running an entirely proprietary operating system. It was designed to be used with many of PPG's synthesizers, including the Wave, by specifying points on a graph displayed on the screen. One could also sample acoustic sounds, or use sounds provided by PPG on disks. The Waveterm was manufactured through 1985.

By this time, to raise sales, PPG had dropped the prices of many of their synthesizers, including the Wave, which would now be sold at around US$6,500 (GB£3,500).

In 1986, Wolfgang Palm designed and began work on a prototype for the Realizer, an all-in-one studio machine not unlike modern day music workstations which combined production, recording, sequencing, and mixing tools into one machine in addition to a sophisticated sampling and synthesis system. It also had the ability to load emulations of other popular synthesizers, such as the Minimoog. The system was too complicated and unfeasible for its time period, and its expensive manufacturing costs caused a projected retail price of almost US$60,000 (GB£34,000). As such, it was never sold, and never got beyond the prototype phase.

There are rumored to be two prototype versions in existence, each with slightly different front panel controls. As interest in Palm's other products waned, the cost of developing the Realizer put PPG into debt. As such, PPG officially ceased business operations and closed its doors in 1987 after shelving the Realizer project.

== Main PPG hardware instruments ==
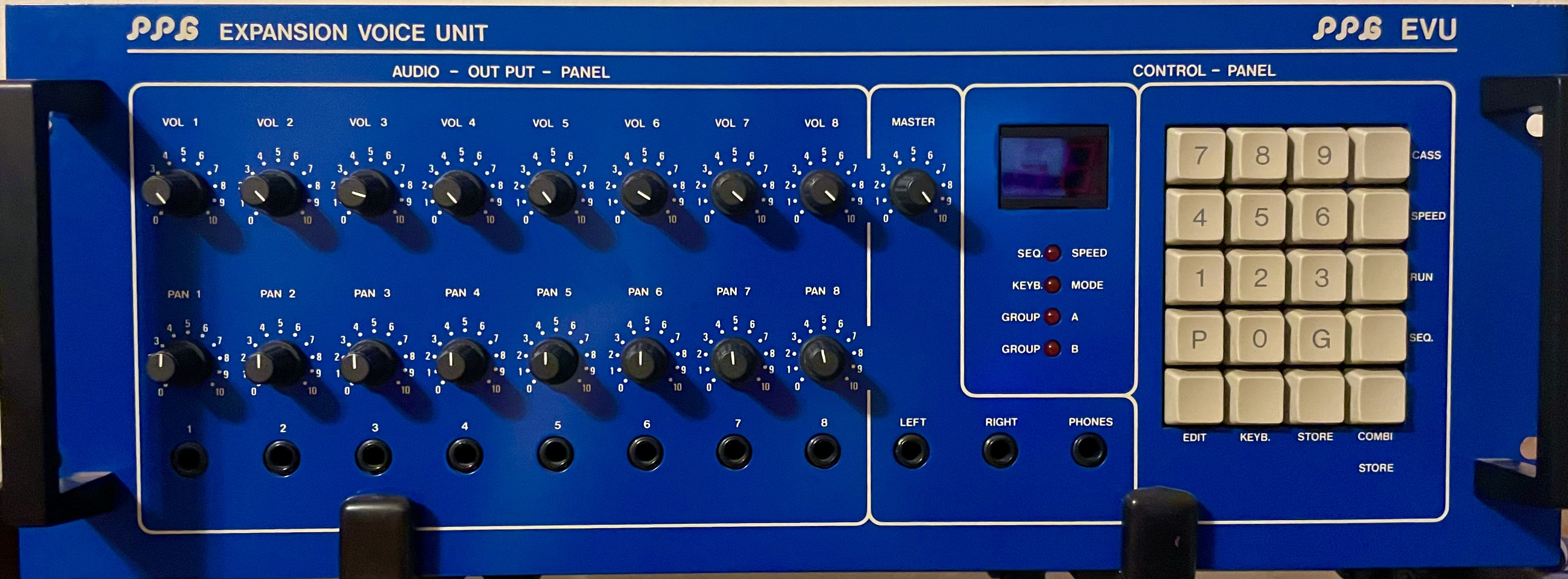
PPG EVU - Expansion Voice Unit

- Series 100 (1975) - analog modular synthesizer
- Series 300 (1975) - analog modular synthesizer
- 1003 Sonic Carrier (1976) - duophonic digital synthesizer
- Series 1002 and 1020 (1977) - monophonic analog synthesizers; the 1002 was distinguished by its VCOs, whereas the 1020 contained DCOs
- Wave Computer 360 (1979) - 8 voice polyphonic digital synthesizer with analog filters and VCAs
- 340/380 System (1979) - digital synthesizer workstation based on the PPG360 voice cards.
- PPG Wave 2, 2.2, 2.3 (1981-1987) - digital synthesizers with analog filters and VCAs
- PRK - Processor Keyboard (1983) - controller keyboard and sequencer
- PRK FD - Processor Keyboard w/Floppy Drive (1985) - controller keyboard and sequencer, with voices loadable from floppy
- EVU - Expansion Voice Unit (1984)
- Waveterm A/B (1985) - rack-mounted computer systems for managing wavetables
- HDU (1986) - hard disk drive recording system and effects processor
- Realizer (1986) - music workstation, prototype only

== Wolfgang Palm after PPG ==
After the decline of PPG, Wolfgang Palm continued work in the area of synthesizer technology. For Waldorf Music he designed the digital ASIC for the first Waldorf product, the MicroWave (1989), a hybrid rackmount module which essentially contained the complete sound engine of the PPG Wave 2.2. Used by many professional artists (including Ace of Base and Depeche Mode), the MicroWave (alongside its keyboard-equipped equivalent the Waldorf Wave) continued to be used long after production ended in the mid-1990s. Later Waldorf products like the fully-digital MicroWave II, XT, Q, microQ, and the Blofeld had all or several of the original wavetables and waveshapes of the PPG Waves. In 2002, Steinberg released PLEX, a software synthesizer he designed.

Palm had a large influence on synthesis and electronic music as a whole. The PPG wave's unique sound, and its widespread usage on numerous electronic and new wave records could be argued to be a cause for the rise in the popularity of digital synthesis in the late 1980s and early 1990s. Wavetable synthesis is still prevalent and used in various hardware and software synthesizers alike, and the Wave's unique integration of analogue and digital circuitry influenced synthesizers such as the Monowave and the E-mu Emulator.

== PPG acquired by Plugin Alliance ==
It was announced in March 2020 that PPG had been acquired by the software company Plugin Alliance.
