= Monowave =

The MonoWave is a monophonic 2U 19" rack synthesizer by Modulus Electronics, UK.

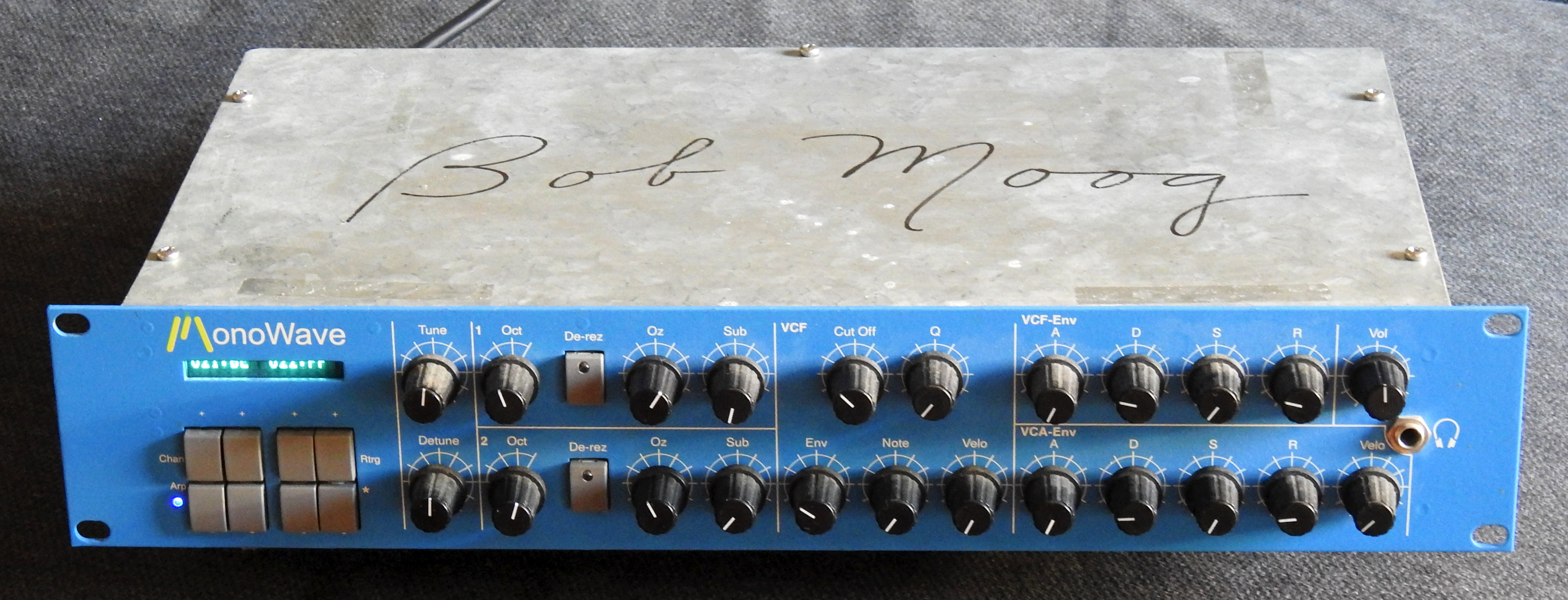
#9 of the 25 serial MonoWaves build by Modulus Electronics. Shown here with a Bob Moog 2002 signed lid

== History ==
This synth was first shown in 2001 by its inventor Paula Maddox on a PPG user/fan meeting. Because its attraction to some synthesizer players at the event, the project was started with 5 beta-test units to test the software and hardware. By spring 2002. the serial production of a 25-piece limited run started. About a year later, all units were sold.

Late in 2005, after many attempts at designing new products, Paula decided to close Modulus Electronics and its website (modulus-music.com). In order that people could still enjoy the Monowave, she worked with Elby Designs to create a kit version of the monowave offering the same features. The software was released at the same time under the GPL license, in the hope that others would continue to develop its features.

== Features ==
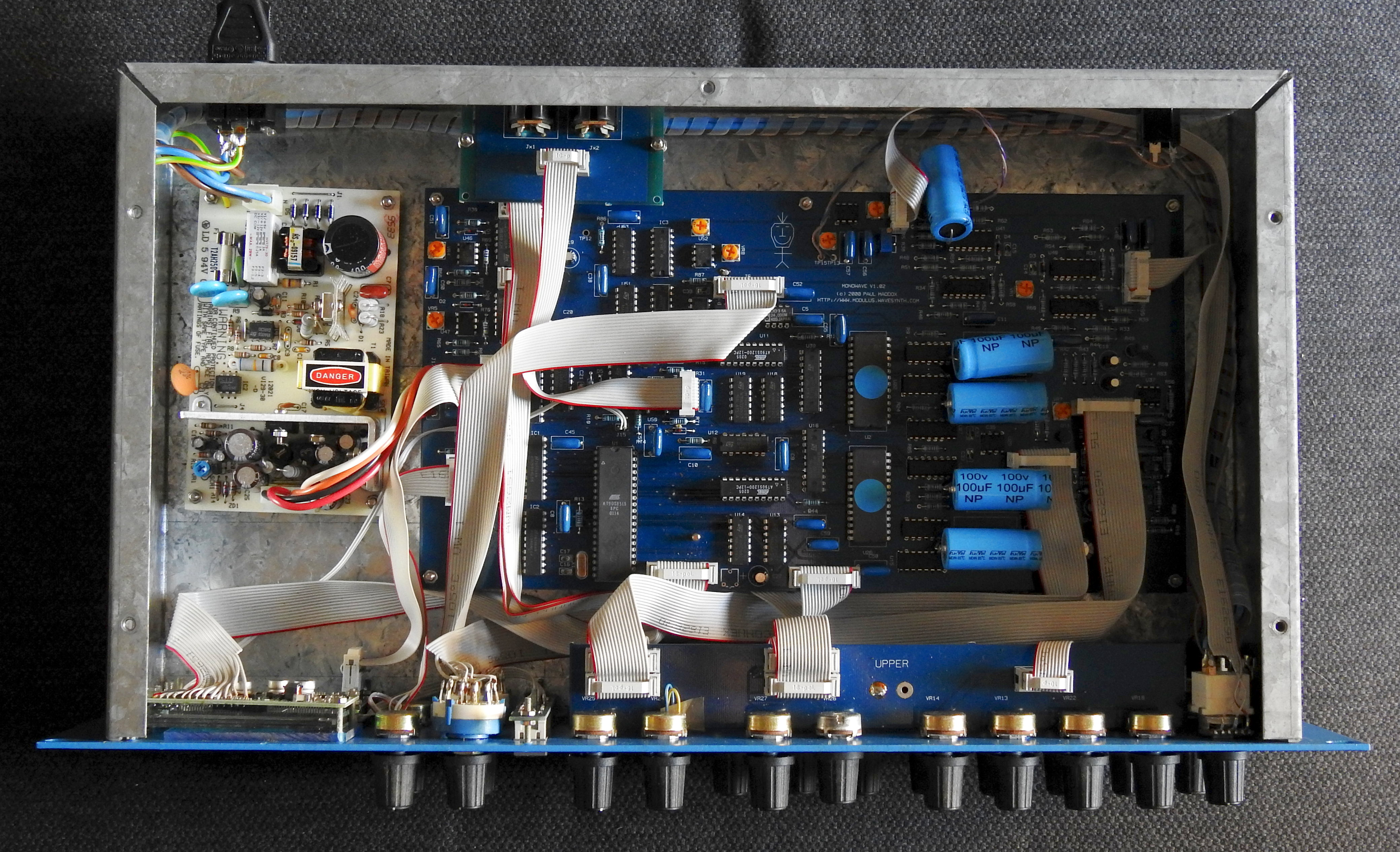
The inside of a Modulus Monowave

It features two digital oscillators with 256 different single-cycle waveshapes selectable individually. There is also a unique de-res, a function to lower the digital waveshapes' sample resolution, to give a sound very much like the famous German PPG wave synthesizers from the eighties. The signal of these oscillators and their suboctave signals are mixed together and then feed in the pure analog part of the synth, a Moog-style 24 dB transistor-ladder lowpass filter and a VCA. Both of them are controlled by their own ADSR envelope. Depending on the installed operating system version, it may either have an arpeggiator or a MIDI-velocity to wavenumber function.

The MonoWave has no patch memory. It can be played via MIDI by sequencers or MIDI keyboards.
