= Waldorf Blofeld =

Blofeld
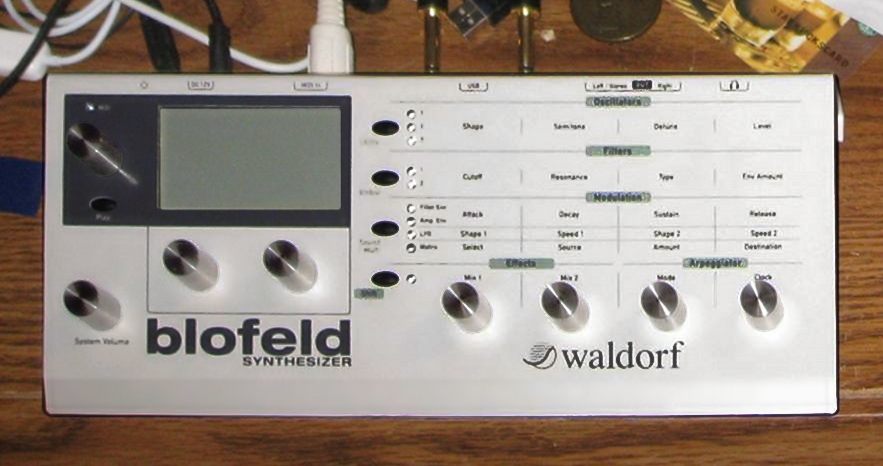
- Manufacturer: Waldorf Music
- Dates: 2007
- Price: £349

Technical specifications
- Polyphony: up to 25-voices
- Timbrality: 16-part
- Oscillator: 3 per voice
- LFO: 3 per voice
- Synthesis type: Analog modeling, Wavetable, FM
- Filter: 2 multimode per voice
- Effects: Chorus, flanger, phaser, overdrive, delay, reverb

Input/output
- Keyboard: None or 49-key
- External control: MIDI (Module, In only; keyboard, In/Out), USB

The Waldorf Blofeld is a synthesizer combining virtual analogue synthesis with wavetable synthesis and FM synthesis. It is available as a small desktop unit and as a 49 key velocity and aftertouch sensitive keyboard version. The keyboard version features extra performance controls; these comprise two performance wheels and up/down transpose keys to shift the range of the keyboard. It is named after the character Ernst Stavro Blofeld, the leader of the fictional SPECTRE organisation from Ian Fleming's James Bond series; this lends its name to the sound management computer application SPECTRE, used to send audio and firmware data to the synthesizer. Two subsequent Waldorf synthesizers have been named after Bond villains; the Stromberg and Largo.

The 25-voice, 16 part multitimbral instrument is marketed as a low-cost unit that can reproduce the sounds from previous Waldorf synthesizers in the Q, also named after a James Bond character, and Wave lines.

Both versions feature a stereo output, headphone output and a USB port for computer control and firmware updates. The desktop unit has MIDI In and the keyboard unit has both In and Out. The desktop unit is powered by an external power supply.

A number of sound packs are available for purchase. Some require a specific sample licence, again at an additional cost.

In December of 2024, Waldorf released a VST version of the Blofeld.
