= Adrian Moore (composer) =

English electroacoustic music composer

Adrian Moore (born January, 1969) is an English electroacoustic music composer. Born in Nottingham, UK, he was educated as at City University, London and the University of Birmingham. He is currently a Professor of Electroacoustic Music Composition at The University of Sheffield and the director of the University of Sheffield Sound Studios.

== Recordings ==
Moore's recordings are available through French-Canadian music label empreintes DIGITALes

- Traces (empreintes DIGITALes, IMED 0053, 2000)
- Rêve de l'aube (empreintes DIGITALes, IMED 0684, 2006)
- Contrechamps (empreintes DIGITALes, IMED 11112, 2011)
- Séquences et tropes (empreintes DIGITALes, IMED 15135, 2015)

== Written works ==
- (2016) Sonic Art : An Introduction to Electroacoustic Music Composition. New York : Routledge, Taylor & Francis Group. ISBN 978-1-138-92503-8

== List of works ==
- (1/V)^{T} (1996)
- 3Pieces: Horn (2007)
- 3Pieces: Piano (2007)
- 3Pieces: Violin (2007)
- And By His Suggestion (1993)
- Becalmed 1 (2001)
- Dreamarena (1996)
- Dreaming of the Dawn (2004)
- Ethereality (2000)
- Fleeting Images
- Foil-Counterfoil (1997)
- Junky (1996)
- Mutiny On The Bounty (2001)
- Out There and Beyond (1999)
- Piano Piece (for Peter) (2004), piano, and tape
- Power Tools (2004)
- Requiem (1996)
- Resonant Image (2003), Surround sound, and video
- Rococo Variations (2005–06)
- Sea of Singularity (2001–03)
- Sieve (1994–95)
- Soundbodies: Bodypart (1998)
- Study in Ink (1997)
- Superstrings (1998–99)
- Third Mint Sauce or Sheep Appoggiatura (2001)
