= Wolfgang Palm =

German musician and inventor (born 1950)

Wolfgang Palm (born 1950) is a German musician and inventor who was the founder and owner of Palm Products GmbH (PPG) and the inventor and creator of various pioneering technical designs for analog and digital synthesizers. He is widely acknowledged as the father of digital synthesis and as a trendsetter in the use of computer technology in the making of electronic music.

Palm's interest in synthesis technology began as a keyboardist in various local bands in his hometown of Hamburg, Germany. His namesake corporation began operating as early as 1975, manufacturing modular synthesizers in small numbers for electronica act Tangerine Dream and other musicians.

Palm is arguably most famous for the development of products using wavetable synthesis, starting in the late 1970s when he created his Minimoog-like synthesizer – the 1020 – featuring digitally controlled oscillators instead of the voltage-controlled oscillators that his 1002 synthesizer and all other analog synthesizers of that time were using. He also created the 360 Wavecomputer that would later become the renowned PPG Wave series. Palm's design was the impetus for the creation of the highly successful PPG Wave synthesizer, which was used by numerous bands throughout the 1980s and beyond. The sounds in the PPG Wave inspired other manufacturers of digital synthesizers, such as Sequential Circuits and Ensoniq. Today, nearly every digital synthesizer is in some way based on the concept of wavetable synthesizers.

Wolfgang Palm was also one of the first people to experiment with data transmission systems for exchange of data between digital synthesizers and sequencers. His early design of an 8-bit parallel bus system was later abandoned and replaced by MIDI.
