= VGMusic.com =

Video game music archive

Video Game Music Archive
- VGMusic.com's main page with logo
- Website type: Music website
- Owner: Mike Newman
- Creator: Mike Newman
- Website: VGMusic.com
- Commercial: No
- Registration: Optional
- Launched: December 19, 1996
- Current status: Active

The Video Game Music Archive, also known as VGMusic.com or VGMA, is a website that archives MIDI sequences of video game music, ranging from tunes of the NES era to modern pieces featured in Xbox Series X/S, Nintendo Switch and PS5 games. Currently, there are over 30,000 MIDI sequences hosted on the site across approximately 47 gaming platforms. The SNES directory has the most MIDI sequences of any directory on this site. VGMusic.com is one of the oldest, if not the oldest, video game music websites online.

The owner of the website is Michael Newman (Yaginuma), who graduated from the University of Connecticut and who is a chemical engineer by day. Day-to-day site operations are maintained by a small team of volunteer staff members, performing tasks such as server administration, site updates and archive maintenance.

== General ==
VGMusic.com accepts remakes/covers, arrangements, and remixes of video game music in MIDI format. The MIDI sequences are typically General MIDI and GM2 standard, but sequences that use proprietary MIDI standards like Roland GS and Yamaha XG are also available on the site. Formerly RIFF MIDI (RMI) format sequences were also available, but currently only MIDI types 0 and 1 (MID) are available. The community is driven by a user-base of musicians from around the world, who transcribe the music into midi format by ear using sequencing software.

In addition to the music sections for game consoles and home computer systems, there is also a Medley section. Submitted medleys consist of music selections from anything between one game and multiple games and franchises; the style or theme of the medleys is at the discretion of the sequencers. There is also a Piano Only section, which hosts sequences transcribed to use two MIDI tracks, one for each hand on piano. These sequences can subsequently be opened using appropriate score-writing software, and printed out as sheet music. Arrangements for piano duet and organ are also accepted.

No users receive money for submitting their sequences, and there are no paid staff sequencers employed by the site.

== Submission process and site standards ==
When the site was initially launched, there was a greater emphasis on quantity rather than quality, but the expected quality of submissions has risen as the user base and popularity of the site has steadily increased over its life-time. The standards are typically lower for songs not currently in the archive, and are often elevated for songs that have been sequenced many times before. The expected quality of remixes is also high.

Updates occur infrequently; the staff asserts that infrequent large updates are easier to perform than frequent smaller ones with the way the site is currently designed. E-mail notifications are sent when files are accepted or rejected, occasionally with feedback with advice for improving the sequence for later revisions or informing the user on what they could do to ensure their sequence is accepted on subsequent submissions. However, there is currently no error-checking done on names or e-mail addresses, meaning users that submit false information will not receive e-mails.

Any file can be removed at the discretion of the staff if they feel it is not up to the site's standards, even after approval. However, many files that were accepted in the site's early days have been grandfathered in, despite not meeting the current standards.

=== Controversy and reform ===
Some music is not permitted to be hosted on the site, at the request of the original composers. The PC section of the site was also removed, but reinstated again several years later, with a warning to not upload rips or conversions of music taken directly from games. There is also a list of composers whose work is not accepted on the site for any apparent reason. The site rejects direct reproductions and rips from original game soundtracks, as well as conversions. This was primarily to minimize copyright infringement issues, but also because of the typically poor quality of conversions, and to focus the site on content created entirely by the users.

== Papers ==
In addition to hosting music, VGMusic.com also hosts several academic papers related to video game music.

- Video Game Music: Not Just Kid Stuff by Matthew Belinke
- Levels of Sound by Eric Pidkameny
- Quality Video Game Music Scores, Considering the Standards Set, and Personal Reflections by Daniel DeCastro

== In the media ==
- "The Fan Site of the Month", Ultra Game Players, October 1997
- King, Brad (February 2000), "Scoring a Grammy", Wired Magazine, vol. 8, no. 2, CondéNet, archived from the original on May 24, 2000
- "Name That Game Tune", Yahoo! Internet Life, p. 56, March 2000
- "Video Game Music Archive", Official PlayStation 2 Magazine UK, p. 124, June 2002
- "Site of the Nite: Videogame Music Archive". The Screen Savers. 2002-10-08. TechTV.
- Kushner, David (October 2003), "Videogame Deejays", Official PlayStation Magazine US
- "Sarah's Web tip: Videogame soundtracks". The Screen Savers. Episode 1144. 2004-01-23. TechTV.
