= Sound Blaster AWE32 =

Sound card for PCs

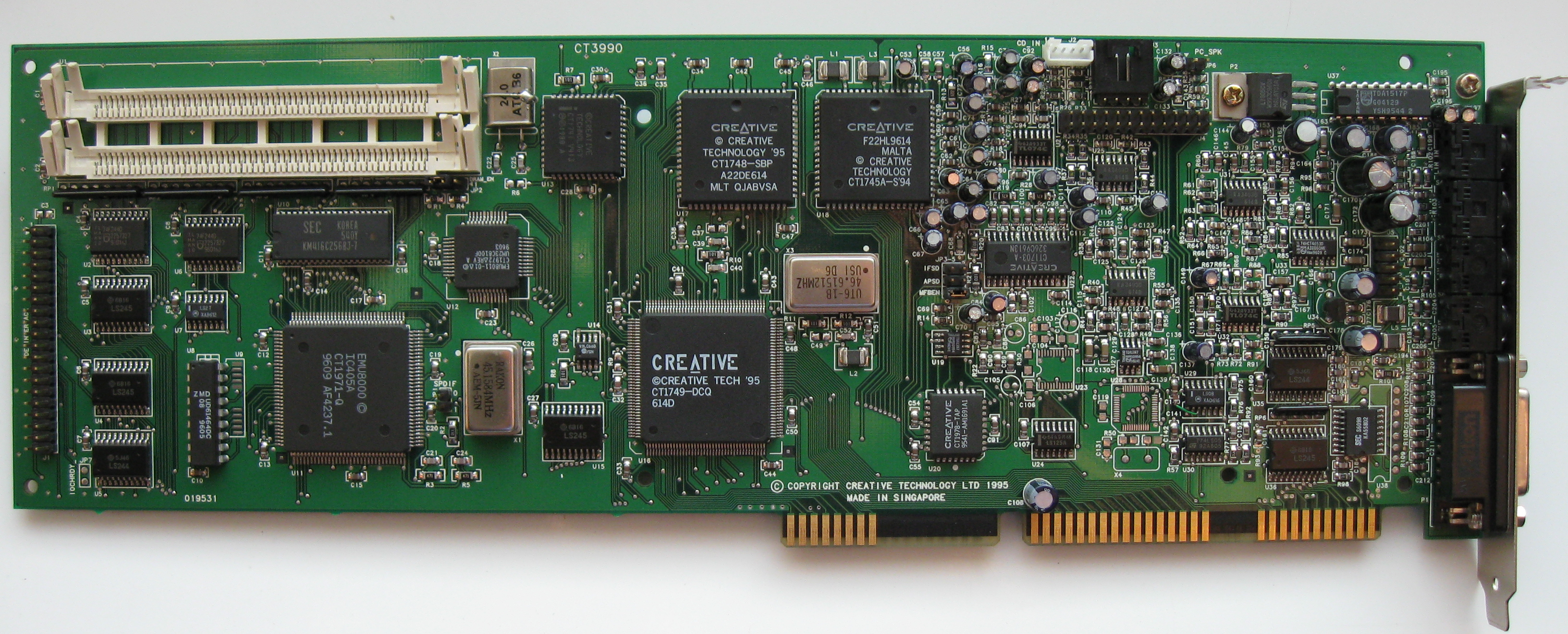
Sound Blaster AWE32 (CT3990)

The Sound Blaster AWE32 is an ISA sound card from Creative Technology. It is an expansion board for IBM PC compatibles and is part of the Sound Blaster family of products. The Sound Blaster AWE32, introduced in March 1994, was a near full-length ISA sound card, measuring 14 inches (356 mm) in length, due to the number of features included.

== Sound Blaster AWE32 ==
=== Backward compatibility ===
The AWE32's digital audio section was basically an entire Sound Blaster 16, and as such, was compatible with Creative's earlier Sound Blaster 2.0 Its specifications included 16-bit 44.1 kHz AD/DA conversion with real-time on-board compression / decompression and the Yamaha OPL3 FM synthesizer chip. However, compatibility was not always perfect and there were situations where various bugs could arise in games. Many of the Sound Blaster AWE32 cards had codecs that supported bass, treble, and gain adjustments through Creative's included mixer software. There were many variants and revisions of the AWE32, however, with numerous variations in audio chipset, amplifier selection and design, and supported features. For example, the Sound Blaster AWE32 boards that utilize the VIBRA chip do not have bass and treble adjustments.

=== MIDI capability ===
The Sound Blaster AWE32 included two distinct audio sections; one being the Creative digital audio section with their audio codec and optional CSP/ASP chip socket, and the second being the E-mu MIDI synthesizer section. The synthesizer section consisted of the EMU8000 synthesizer and effects processor chip, 1 MB EMU8011 sample ROM, and a variable amount of RAM (none on the SB32, 512 KB on the AWE32; RAM was expandable to 28 MB on both cards). These chips comprised a powerful and flexible sample-based synthesis system, based on E-mu's high-end sampler systems such as the E-mu Emulator III and E-mu Proteus. The effects processor generated various effects (i.e. reverb and chorus) and environments on MIDI output, similar to the later EAX standard on Live! and newer cards. It can also add effects to the output from the Yamaha OPL3's FM synthesis. The AWE32 was the first sampler to support E-Mu's SoundFont standard, which allowed users to build custom sound sets using their own samples, the samples included in ROM, or both. The card was sold with software for building custom SoundFonts. All of Creative's subsequent cards, other than the Sound Blaster PCI64/128 series, support SoundFonts.

On the initial release, Creative promoted the EMU8000 as a waveguide physical modelling synthesis engine, due to its ability to work with delay lines. The option was used mostly as an effect engine for chorus and flanging effects. Actual physical modeling instruments were not popular on the AWE, although some support exists in the SoundFont format.

The AWE32 didn't use its MPU-401 port to access the EMU8000 — Creative decided to expose the EMU8000's registers directly, through three sets of non-standard ports, and interpret MIDI commands in software on the host CPU. As with the Gravis Ultrasound, software designers had to write special AWE32 support into their programs. To support older software, the AWE32 featured OPL-3 FM synthesis, and came with the AWEUTIL program which attempted to provide GM/MT-32/GS redirection to the native AWE hardware; however, AWEUTIL wasn't compatible with all programs or motherboards due to its use of the non-maskable interrupt (a feature that was omitted or disabled on many clone boards), and it used a lot of precious DOS conventional memory. Also, if a game used DOS 32-bit protected mode through a non-DPMI compliant DOS extender, then the MPU-401 emulation would not function and the EMU8000 would not be used unless directly supported by the software. This did not affect the Creative Wave Blaster daughterboard header. AWE32's usage in Windows was simplified by the fact that Windows 3.1x had drivers which made the OPL3 and the EMU8000 appear like any other MIDI peripheral, on their own MIDI interfaces.

=== CD-ROM interfaces ===
Also on AWE32 was a Panasonic/Sony/Mitsumi CD-ROM interface (to support proprietary non-ATAPI CD-ROM drives), the Wave Blaster header and two 30-pin SIMM slots to increase DRAM based buffer memory. Later Sound Blaster AWE32 revisions replaced the proprietary CD-ROM interfaces with the ATAPI interface. The Sound Blaster AWE32 supported up to 28 MB of additional SIMM memory. A maximum of 32 MB could be added to the Sound Blaster AWE32 but the synthesizer could not address all of it (4MB of the EMU8000's address space was reserved for sample ROM).

=== Model numbers ===
The model numbers assigned to the Sound Blaster AWE32 include the following:

- CT27**: CT2760, CT2760 Rev3(issues with wavetable db reported)
- CT36**: CT3601, CT3602, CT3603, CT3607, CT3630, CT3631, CT3632, CT3636, CT3660, CT3661, CT3662, CT3665, CT3666, CT3670, CT3680
- CT37**: CT3780
- CT39**: CT3900, CT3910, CT3919, CT3940, CT3960, CT3980, CT3990, CT3991, CT3999
- CT43**: CT4330, CT4331, CT4332

== Sound Blaster 32 ==
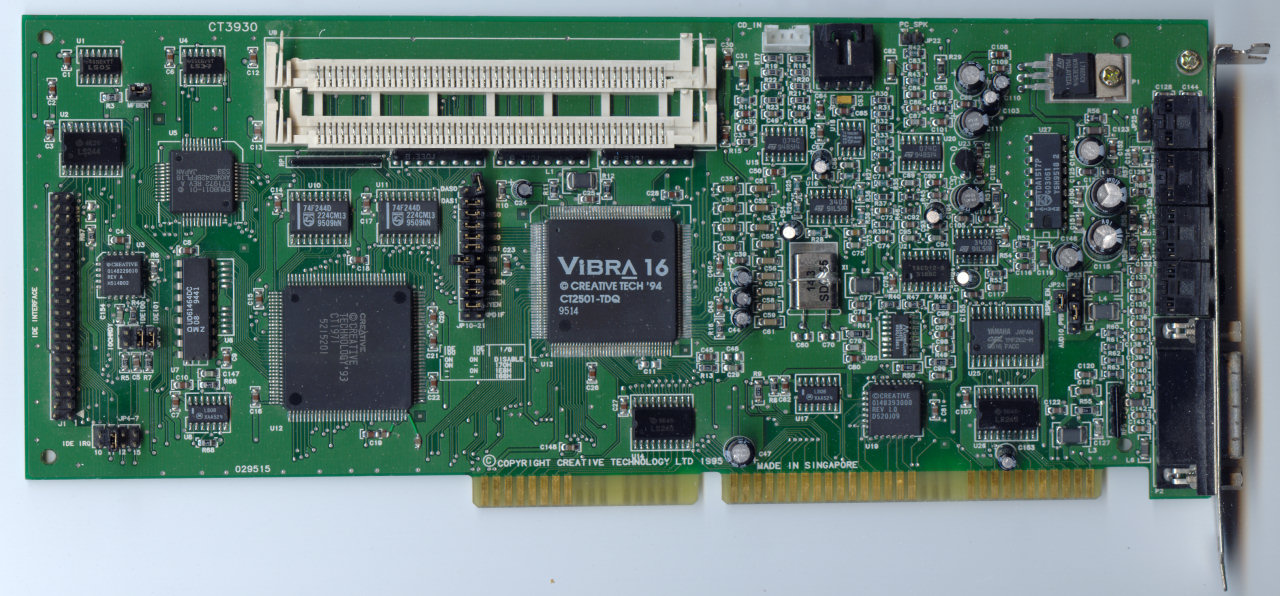
Sound Blaster 32 (CT3930)

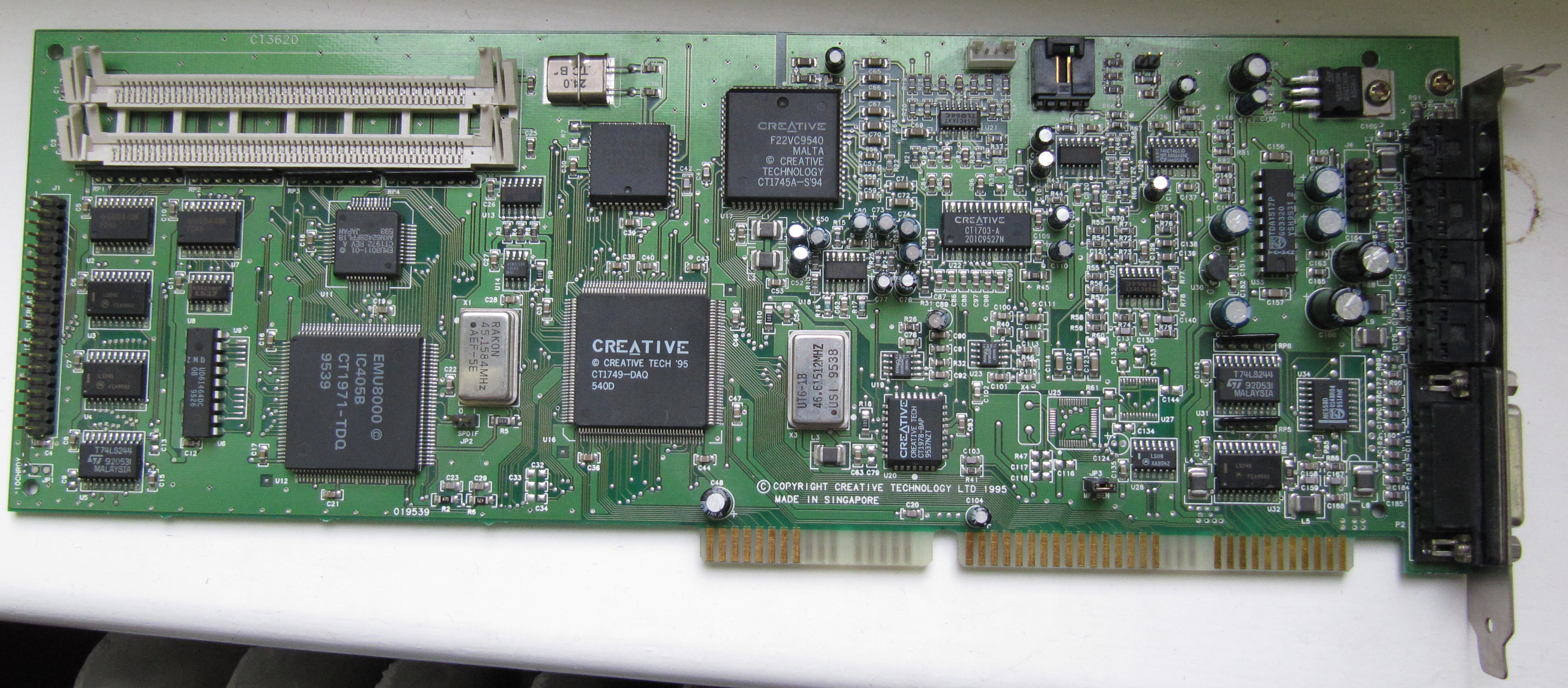
Sound Blaster 32 (CT3620)

The Sound Blaster 32 (SB32) was a value-oriented offering from Creative, released in 1995, designed to fit below the AWE32 Value in the lineup. The SB32 lacked onboard RAM, the Wave Blaster header, and the CSP socket. The boards also used ViBRA integrated audio chips, which lacked adjustments for bass, treble, and gain (except ViBRA CT2502). The SB32 had the same MIDI capabilities as the AWE32, and had the same 30-pin SIMM RAM expansion capability. The board was also fully compatible with the AWE32 option in software and used the same Windows drivers. Once the SB32 was outfitted with 30-pin SIMMs, its sampler section performed identically to the AWE32's. OPL-3 support varied among the models: the CT3930 came with a Yamaha YMF262 OPL-3 FM synthesis chip, whereas most models feature CQM synthesis either integrated into the ViBRA chip or via an external CT1978 chip. The majority of Sound Blaster 32 cards used TDA1517 amplifiers. Some Sound Blaster 32 PnP with onboard 512kB RAM was sold as AWE32 OEM in Dell computers.

=== Model numbers ===
The model numbers assigned to the Sound Blaster 32 include the following:

- CT36**: CT3600, CT3604, CT3605, CT3620, CT3640, CT3670, CT3671, CT3672, CT3681, CT3690
- CT39**: CT3930
- CT43**: CT4335, CT4336

== Sound Blaster AWE32 Value ==
The Sound Blaster AWE32 Value was another value-oriented offering. It lacked SIMM slots and the ASP processor, but featured 512kB onboard RAM and an (empty) ASP chip socket.
