= Roland SC-8850 =

Roland GS/GM compatible MIDI sound module

- Developer: Roland Corporation
- Type: General MIDI, General MIDI Level 2, Roland GS, Yamaha XG
- Released: 1999
- Predecessor: Roland SC-88 Pro

The Roland ED SC-8850 (Sound Canvas) is a GS-compatible MIDI sound module released in 1999 by Roland under the name RolandED. The SC-8850 was the first sound module to incorporate the new General MIDI Level 2 standard. The SC-8850 uses a PCM sampling engine based on that of the SC-88 Pro, and supports 128-voice polyphony with 64-part multitimbrality. It came preloaded with the soundsets of all older Sound Canvas models, as well as the CM-32 and MT-32. Aimed at personal computer users, the SC-8850 features 1,703 instrument patches, including the GS sounds and additional GM2 sounds. The selection of effects includes reverb, chorus, and Roland's own Insertion EFX, which adds effects like vibrato, distortion, tremolo, etc.

== SC-8820 ==
Alongside the SC-8850, Roland released the Roland ED SC-8820, an inexpensive cut-down version of the MIDI module, smaller than the 8850. Both SC-8850 and ED SC-8820 could be rackmounted alongside each other. The Roland SC-8820 model lacks the large LCD screen and extended controls of the SC-8850. Some sounds are different in comparison to the 8850, but has a map that is compatible with the 8850. Both models have external appearance similar to Roland's older models. Roland later released the SK-500 in 2000, a version of the SC-8820 with a 49 keys keyboard and no MIDI input, requiring users to use either the USB or RS-232C connections to send data.

The Sound Canvas VA plugin emulates an SC-8820 with minor inaccuracies.

== SC-D70 ==
In 2001, Roland released the Roland ED SC-D70, which was a SC-8820 with a digital output, among other differences. It had a sampling rate of 44.1/48 kHz, instead of 32 kHz sounds the SC-8820 had. The sample rate could be selected between 44.1 and 48. The SC-D70 also lacks a map select button on the module, meaning you must send SysEx messages to change the map. The SC-D70 is the only Sound Canvas module that had a digital output.

== See also ==
- Roland SC-55
