= Roland SC-7 =

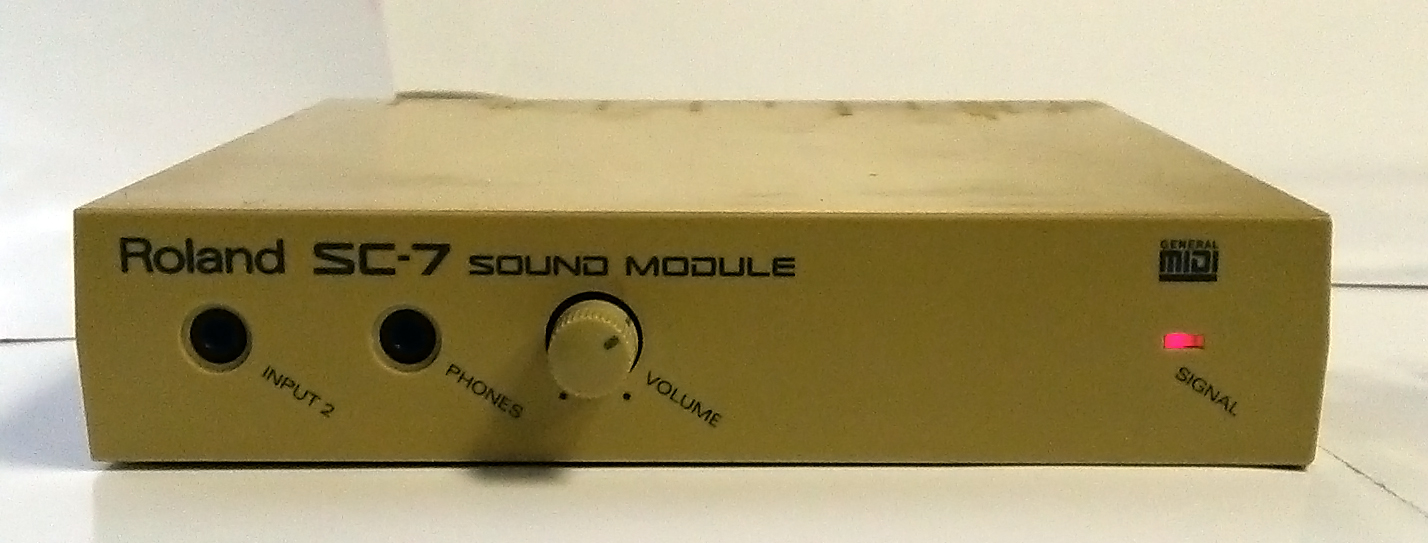
Roland General MIDI Sound Module SC-7

The Roland SC-7 General MIDI Sound Module is a stand-alone MIDI synthesizer module by Roland Corporation. It was released in 1992. It supports the General MIDI System and can also be used as a MIDI interface for a computer. The Roland SC-7 provides the basic (capital) Roland Sound Canvas sounds in a compact design for stand-alone, IBM PC/AT or Apple Macintosh computer use.

== Features ==
The SC-7 is 16-part multitimbral with 28-voice polyphony. Individual sounds use one or two voices. It complies to the General MIDI System Level 1 Specification with 128 sounds, 6 drum sets (derived from GS drum sets) digital reverb/delay and chorus effects. The Roland SC-7's ROM samples sound similar with other Roland Sound Canvas and other Roland products from the same era, for example, the Roland SCC-1, the Roland SC-55, the Roland XP-10 synthesizer, and the Roland E-Series Intelligent Keyboard lineup.

The SC-7 has two audio inputs (one with level adjust) to mix two different audio sources, for example, a D/A converter (a computer sound card) or an external CD-player together with the SC-7's own output all at the sound module's audio output, making it easy to connect to amplification or speaker devices.

It can also be configured as a MIDI interface for either IBM PC/AT or Apple Macintosh computers with a special serial cable and Roland software.

The Roland SCB-7 was a Roland MIDI Daughterboard version of the SC-7 that plugged into the Wave Blaster Connector of the Sound Blaster line of sound cards for the PC. The Roland RAP-10 was an ISA sound card with the SC-7 on board along with digital sampling.

== Physical connections and dimensions ==
- Host Connector Connection (mini-DIN 8 pin, for a RS-232C or RS-422 computer connection)
- MIDI In (for sound module MIDI input in stand-alone operation or for MIDI interface MIDI input in serial/computer operation)
- Audio Input 1 (stereo 3.5mm miniature jack)
- Audio Input 2 (stereo 3.5mm miniature jack, in front-panel)
- Audio Output (RCA jack L, R)
- Headphone Output (stereo 3.5mm miniature jack, in front-panel)

Dimensions are 168 (w) x 203 (d) x 35 (h) mm and weight 0.5 kg.

Power requirements: draws 300 mA of current at 9 volts. Polarity: shield (sleeve) positive, core (tip) negative. In Finland, ships with the Roland ACI-230C power supply unit.

== Use in media ==
The sounds of the Roland SC-7 (or other similar Roland product) can be recognized in various (low-budget) television or music productions. It is also commonly used in jingles for commercials or other television programs.

Roland SC-7 Performance Demo
Various MIDI files rendered into digital format to showcase Roland SC-7 sounds

== See also ==
- Roland Sound Canvas
