= Comparison of MIDI standards =

This table provides summary of comparison of various MIDI enhancement standards by various parameters.

| | MPU | MT-32 | GM | GS | XG level 1 | XG level 2 | XG level 3 | GM level 2 | XGlite |
|---|---|---|---|---|---|---|---|---|---|
| Entry date | 1984 | 1987 | 1991 | 1991 | 1994 | 1997 | 1998 | 1999 | 2002 |
| Organization | Roland | | JMSC (AMEI); MMA | Roland | Yamaha | | | MMA | Yamaha |
Minimum equipment requirements
| Simultaneous melodic voices | | 8+ combined (up to 32 partials) | 16 | 16 | 32 combined | 64 combined | 128 combined | 16 | 32 combined |
| Simultaneous percussion voices | | 8+ combined (up to 32 partials) | 8 | 8 | 32 combined | 64 combined | 128 combined | 16 | 32 combined |
| MIDI melodic channels | | 8 | 15 | 15 (Note: 16 with no drum kit.) | 16 combined | 32 combined (on 2 ports) | 64 combined (on 4 ports) | 14 | 16 combined |
| Rhythm/percussion channels | | 1 | 1 (#10) | 1 | 16 combined | 32 combined (on 2 ports) | 64 combined (on 4 ports) | 2 (#10 & #11) | 16 combined |
| Channel recommendations | | | #10: drums | | #1: melody; #2: melody (duet); #3: bass; #4: pad; #5: riff; #10: drums | | | | |
Sounds banks available
| Melodic instruments | | 128 | 128 | 226 | 480 | 1074 | 1149 | 256 | 360 |
| Drum kits | | 1 | 1 | 8 + 1 SFX kit | 9 + 2 SFX kits | 34 + 2 SFX kits | 35 + 2 SFX kits | 9 | 12 kits |
| Drum sounds per kit | | 30 | 47 | 61 | 72 | | | 61 | 53 |
Controls available
| Special CC (Note: Special CCs are CCs that don't correspond to the parameter of any particular effect. Most usually they represent special one-shot control commands for the device (these ones are usually represented by a button on a console), or used internally for bank selection, RPN or data entry, etc.) | | 2 | 6 (MT32+4) | | | | | 6 (GM) | |
| Parametric effect CC (Note: Parametric CCs (also known as continuous controller) correspond to the parameter of some particular effect (i.e. depth, strength, delay of effect, etc). Such CCs are usually represented by a rotating knob or fader in mixers.) | | 4 | 5 | 16 (GM+11) | 51 (GM+46) | | | 12 (GM+7) | |
| RPNs | | 0 | 5 | | | | | 6 (GM+1) | |
| SysEx messages | | | 2 | | | | | 14 | |
