= Roland Sound Canvas =

PCM sound module and sound card series

The Roland Sound Canvas (Japanese: ローランド・サウンド・キャンバス, Hepburn: Rōrando Saundo Kyanbasu) lineup is a series of General MIDI (GM) based pulse-code modulation (PCM) sound modules and sound cards, primarily intended for computer music usage, created by Japanese manufacturer Roland Corporation. Some models include a serial or USB connection to a personal computer.

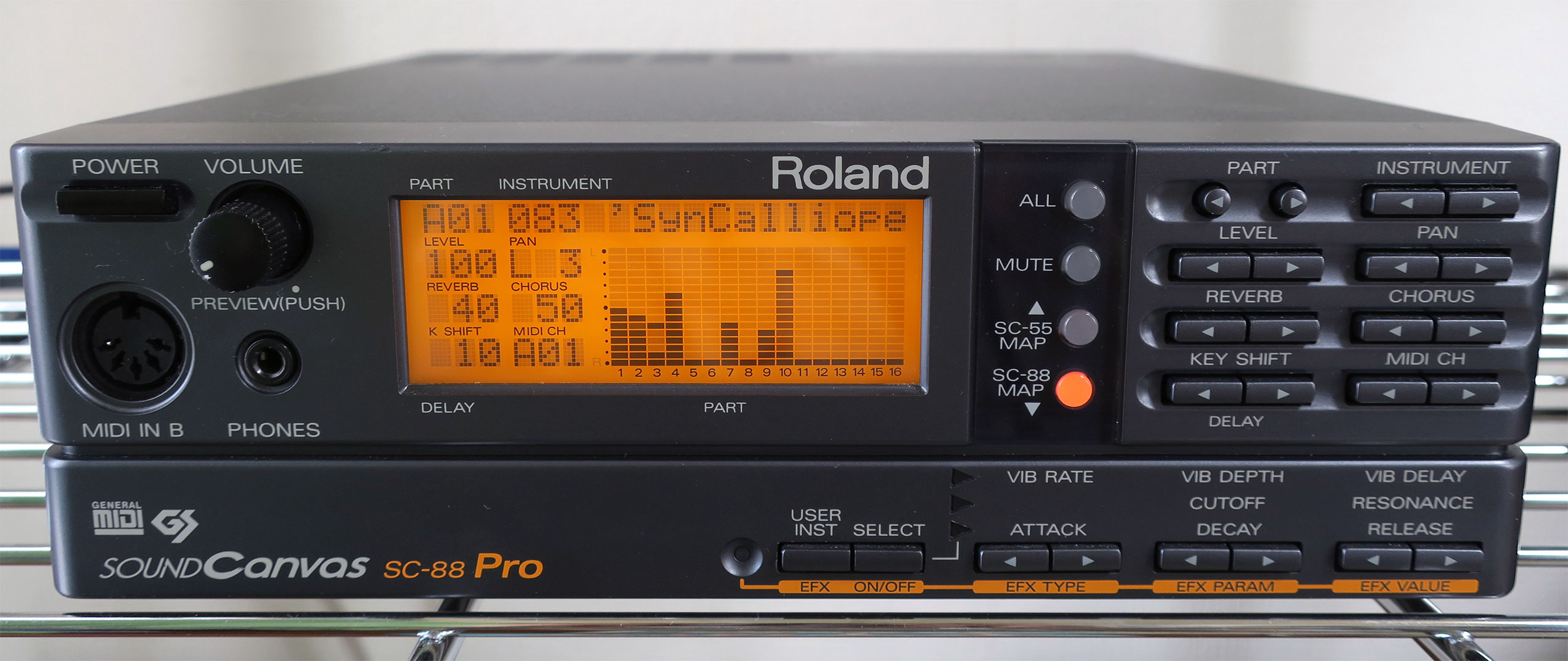
Sound Canvas SC-88 Pro

== Products ==
=== Sound Canvas ===
The first Sound Canvas units (SC-55 and SB-55) were pre-sold in December 1990 with the SC-55 only, and were finally sold in March 1991 with the SC-55 and later in the winter of 1991 with the SB-55. In some cases, the Sound Canvas series models are also sold as "Edirol" rather than "Roland" as the brand name (e.g. mainly with the SC-88VL). Roland sold GM/GS technology and samples under entertainment products like the MT-90s (Japan only licensed version: Suzuki SMT-1) and boombox MT-80s.

Model	Year	Standards	Parts	Voices	Tones	Drumsets	Output resolution	Notes	References
Roland SC-55	1990	GM GS	16	24	317	9	16-bit @ 32 kHz	Half Rack unit, first product of the line, units without GM logo and with firmware <v1.20 technically not GM compatible (GM reset interpreted as GS reset, capital tone arrangement not fully consistent with GM spec, Patch #122 is "Fl. Key Click" instead of "Breath Noise").	
Roland SB-55 (Sound Brush)	1991							Half Rack unit. Floppy disk-based MIDI file player that was bundled with a remote control (Also works on the SC-55, 155, and 55mkII). Supports SMF types 0 & 1. A blank disk can be inserted for recording purposes, but only records in type 0 (A whole performance merged into one track). Playback starts automatically when a disk is inserted.	
Roland SC-7	1992	GM	16	28	128	6	16-bit @ 32 kHz	No display, introduced serial port for PC/Mac connectivity.	
Roland SC-33	1992	GM GS	16	28	226	8	16-bit @ 32 kHz	Table top version of SC-50, rebranded as BOSS Dr. Synth DS-330 (fewer tones). Discontinued in 1996.	
Roland SC-155	1992	GM GS	16	24	317	9	16-bit @ 32 kHz	Table top version of SC-55.	
Roland SC-55mkII	1993	GM GS	16	28	354	9	18-bit @ 32 kHz	Half Rack unit. A minor upgrade to the original SC-55. ALL of them uses the very same DAC from NEC model μPD63200GS, the ONLY change is the BIT parameter, it can be 16-bit or 18-bit, selected by pin 3 on NEC. Configuration as follow: LOW/OPEN for 16-bit, or HIGH (+5V) for 18-bit.	
Roland SC-55ST	1993	GM GS	16	28	354	9	16-bit @ 32 kHz	Half Rack unit. Lower cost version of SC-55mkII. No display and only one MIDI input. 16 bit DAC (UPD6379)	
Roland SC-55K	1993	GM GS	16	28	354	9	16-bit @ 32 kHz	Half Rack unit. Japan-exclusive karaoke model based on the SC-55ST. No display or front panel operation but features dual mic inputs and built-in echo effects, all of which can be individually adjusted by the knobs at the front of the unit. Retains rear I/O from the SC-55mkII.	
Roland P-55	1993		3	28	32	0		Piano module, with a limited set of instruments. Can be used in tandem with other GS/GM compatible synthesizers via their MIDI THRU ports to override certain instruments.	
Roland SC-50	1993	GM GS	16	28	226	9	18-bit @ 32 kHz	SC-55mkII without the Roland MT-32 patches, only one MIDI input.	
Roland SD-35	1993	GM GS	16	28	223	8	16-bit @ 32 kHz	SC-50 with integrated MIDI sequencer.	
Roland SC-88	1994	GM GS	32	64	654	22	18-bit @ 32 kHz	Half Rack unit, additional height for more controls, introduced multiple triggering and EQ, SC-55 map support (with differences).	
Roland M-GS64	1995	GM GS	32	64	654	22	18-bit @ 32 kHz	A 1U rackmount version of the SC-88.	
Roland SC-88VL	1996	GM GS	32	64	654	22	18-bit @ 32 kHz	Smaller sized version of SC-88, with a same size and panel layout as the SC-55. Some units are marketed as an "Edirol" product and have a distinct beige finish.	
Roland SC-88ST	1996	GM GS	32	64	654	22	18-bit @ 32 kHz	Half-rack unit with LEDs for MIDI activity. 2 MIDI ins, 1 out. There is one single button on the front panel for switching between SC-55 and SC-88 modes.	
Roland SC-88 Pro	1996	GM GS	32	64	1117	42	18-bit @ 32 kHz	SC-55 and SC-88 map support, introduced Insertion EFX and unofficial XG compatibility.	
Roland SC-88ST Pro	1997	GM GS	32	64	1117	42	18-bit @ 32 kHz	Half-rack unit with LEDs for MIDI activity. 2 MIDI ins, 1 out. There is one single button on the front panel for SC-55/SC-88/SC-88 Pro modes.	
Roland SC-880	1998	GM GS	32	64	1117	42	18-bit @ 32 kHz	A 1U rackmount unit similar to the SC-88 Pro, but with an enhanced "patch mode" and a newer DAC.	
Roland ED SC-8850	1999	GM GS GM2	64	128	1640	63	20-bit @ 32 kHz	Desktop module that can connect via USB. Contains a new native map as well as SC-55, SC-88, and SC-88 Pro maps for backwards compatibility. However, compatibility with these units is flawed due to modifications made to the synthesis engine as well as improper mapping of older instruments.	
Roland ED SC-8820	1999	GM GS GM2	32	64	1608	63	20-bit @ 32 kHz	Mobile MIDI device with no LCD, successor of the SC-88ST Pro. USB-powered, but does not act as a full USB audio device. A software editor such as GS Advanced Editor is required to edit sounds. Despite similarities, patches and effects occasionally play differently from the 8850 - some samples on the 8850 are stereo while the 8820 versions are mono and vice versa.	
Roland ED SC-D70	2001	GM GS GM2	32	64	1608	63	20-bit @ 32 kHz for INST, 24-bit @ 44.1 kHz or 48 kHz for WAVE	Digital audio-oriented desktop module version of the SC-8820. Contains A/D inputs as well as USB audio functionality when connected to a host system. This is also the only Sound Canvas module to have digital audio ports built in. The output can be selected either 44.1 kHz or 48 kHz.	

=== Sound Canvas Personal Computer Products ===
Model	Year	Standards	Parts	Voices	Tones	Drumsets	Output resolution	Notes	References
Roland SCC-1	1992	GM GS	16	24	317 / 354	9	16-bit @ 32 kHz	PC based ISA card (8-bit). The SCC-1A and SCC-1B (different software packed with card) revision upgraded the board to 354 tones. First model technically not GM compatible (GM reset interpreted as GS reset).	
Roland RAP-10	1993	GM	16	26	128	6	16-bit @ 32 kHz	PC based ISA high-end Soundcard. Includes two-channel 16-bit digital audio support.	
Roland GPPC-N	1993	GM GS	16	28	354	9	16-bit @ 32 kHz	NEC PC-9801 card to insert in computer	
Roland SCB-7	1995	GM	16	28	128	6	16-bit @ 32 kHz	Daughter board to attach to a Soundcard Waveblaster port. Also sold as SCD-10 and SCM-10 in bundle with MPU-401/AT.	
Roland SCB-55	1995	GM GS	16	28	354	9	18-bit @ 32 kHz	Daughter board to attach to a Soundcard Waveblaster port. Also sold as SCD-15 and SCM-15 in bundle with MPU-401/AT. Internally 18-bit resolution, will be limited to 16-bit because of daughterboard connector, unless a hardware modification is performed (L/R external connectors or as an external unit). The SCD-15 was installed in Charlie Lab Megabeat One MIDI devices as well. Charlie Lab was very popular in southern Europe back in the 1990s/2000s.	
Roland SCP-55	1995	GM GS	16	28	354	9	18-bit @ 32 kHz	PCMCIA card to insert in notebook/laptop computer	

=== Computer Music Products ===
Model	Year	Standards	Parts	Voices	Tones	Drumsets	Output resolution	Notes
Roland CM-300	1991	GM GS	16	24	317	9	16-bit @ 32 kHz	"Computer music" version of the SC-55, no screen. A beige box with a volume knob and two LEDs on the front, technically not GM compatible (GM reset interpreted as GS reset).
Roland CM-500	1991	GM GS MT-32	16	24	317	9	16-bit @ 32 kHz	A beige box with a volume knob and two LEDs on the front, technically not GM compatible (GM reset interpreted as GS reset), combines the CM-300 with a CM-64.

=== Sound Canvas and Keyboard ===
The following combine a sound canvas module with a built in MIDI keyboard

Model	Year	Standards	Parts	Voices	Tones	Drumsets	Output resolution	Notes	References
Roland SK-50	1994	GM GS	16	28	226	8	16-bit @ 32 kHz	SC-50 with 61 key MIDI keyboard. Only SK unit with integrated speakers.	
Roland SK-50 IV	1997	GM GS	16	28	226	8	16-bit @ 32 kHz	Similar to above, but in a beige finish.	
Roland SK-88 Pro	1999	GM GS	32	64	1117	42	18-bit @ 32 kHz	SC-88 Pro with 37 key MIDI keyboard	
Roland SK-500	2000	GM GS GM2	32	64	1608	63	24-bit @ 32 kHz	SC-8820 with 49 Key MIDI keyboard	

=== Studio Canvas ===
A Edirol Studio Canvas SD-80 displaying a user saved patch

Studio Canvas was a series of PCM sound modules with built in audio interfaces (some models only) sold under both Edirol and Roland branding. The samples contained in the ROMs of these units do not in all cases mirror the original SC-7 / SC-55 GM/GS samples. GM2 is downward compatible with GM.

Model	Year	Standards	Parts	Voices	Tones	Drumsets	Output resolution	Notes	References
Edirol SD-20	2002	GM2 GS XGlite	32	64	660	23	24-bit @ 44.1 kHz	A MIDI device with no LCD designed for laptops and computers, and has a very similar design to the SC-8820. USB-powered, but does not come with its own built-in audio interface. Has 3 analog output (2 RCA L/R) (1 3.5mm phones front pannel), one digital output (TOSLINK), and one input (1 3.5mm LINE IN) Has different presets than SD-80/90/50	
Edirol SD-80	2002	GM2 GS XGlite	32	128	1050	30	24-bit @ 44.1 kHz	A 1U half-rack version of the Edirol SD-90 with 144 user patch slots (128Inst/16Rhythm) and without a built-in audio interface. Has five analog outputs (4 ¼"TS) (1 ¼"phones front pannel) and two digital outputs (1 S/PDIF) (1 TOSLINK). Digital outs locked at 44.1KHz sample rate.	
Edirol SD-90	2001	GM2 GS XGlite	32	128	1050	30	24-bit @ 44.1 or 48 kHz	Has a built in WDM/ASIO 2.0 compatible audio interface with inbuilt effects. Does not support saving of user patches. Has five analog outputs (4 RCA L/R) (1 3.5mm stereo front pannel), three analog inputs (2 RCA L/R) (¼"TRS front pannel), three digital outputs (1 S/PDIF) (1 TOSLINK) (1 USB), and three digital inputs (1 S/PDIF) (1 TOSLINK) (1 USB)	
Roland SD-50	2009	GM2 GS	16	128	1125	32	16 or 24-bit @ 44.1 kHz	Mobile Studio Canvas. Has a built in WDM/ASIO compatible audio interface. Has three analog outputs (2 RCA L/R)(1 3.5mm Stereo), one digital (USB), three analog inputs (1 stereo 3.5mm LINE IN) (1 XLR 48V available) (1 ¼"TRS Hi-Z available), one digital (USB). Has different presets than SD-20/80/90. Does not support XGlite.	

=== Virtual Sound Canvas ===
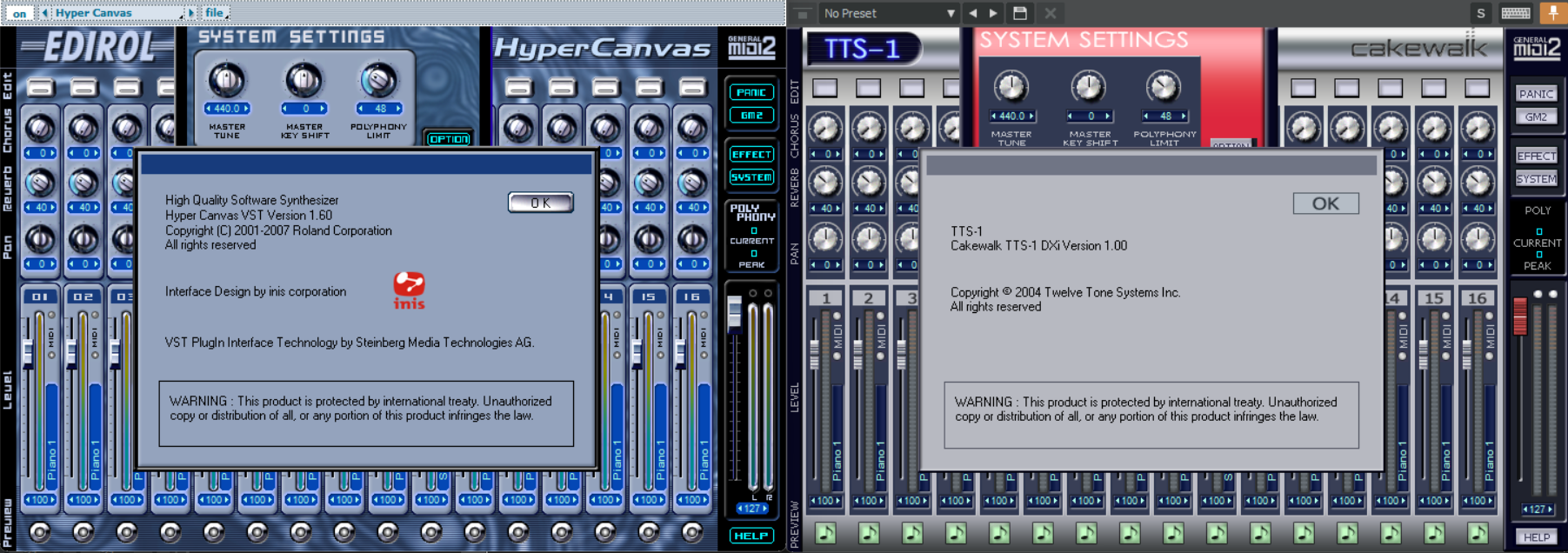
Hyper Canvas and TTS-1

Roland Sound Canvas VA (Set to SC-55 Map) playing a demo MIDI file

There is also the VSC, Virtual Sound Canvas, range of PC software which provide GM and GS synthesis on Windows PCs. Many versions of Cakewalk's Sonar software came bundled with a copy of VSC, though from Sonar 4 onwards they ship with the improved TTS-1 softsynth, which Roland has sold previously through its Edirol subsidiary as the HyperCanvas.

Model	Year	Standards	Parts	Voices	Tones	Drumsets	Notes	References
VSC-55	1996	GM GS	16	128	226	9		
VSC-88H3	2000	GM GS GM2	16	128	902	26	With SC-55, SC-88 and SC-88 Pro compatible instrument mappings. Most of the instrument samples are from the SC-55.	
VSC-MP1	2001	GM GS GM2	16	128	902	26	With SC-55, SC-88 and SC-88 Pro compatible instrument mappings. Most of the instrument samples are from the SC-55. A multipack containing the standalone MIDI synthesizer, a DXi plugin and a VSTi plugin. This is the only Windows NT OS family compatible version (Windows 2000/XP).	
SOUND Canvas for iOS	2015	GM GS GM2	16		1600	63	iOS MIDI player app without patch editing.	
Sound Canvas VA	2015	GM GS GM2	16	64	1600	63	VSTi/AU plugin based on the SC-8820. Discontinued on September 1, 2024.	

==== Discontinuation of Sound Canvas VA ====
In July 2024 Roland announced that it would not longer be supporting the Sound Canvas VA software from the Roland Cloud service. The Software would no longer be freely available starting September 1, of 2024.

=== Microsoft GS Wavetable SW Synth ===
Microsoft GS Wavetable SW Synth, included in instances of DirectX as an integral part of DirectMusic, and on Microsoft Windows since Windows 98, incorporates sounds from the Sound Canvas series (including the picked bass from SC-88 and the steel-string acoustic guitar from SC-88 Pro; the remainder is from the SC-55) licensed by Microsoft from Roland on October 22, 1996. A four-megabyte file, titled "GM.DLS", contains the sample set in DLS format. Under Windows 9x, Microsoft GS Wavetable SW Synth is available only if WDM-capable sound driver is installed.

=== Apple QuickTime Software Wavetable Synthesizer ===
In 1997, Apple licensed the complete Roland Sound Canvas instrument set and GS Format extensions for improved playback of MIDI music files in QuickTime 3.0. This replaced the limited set of instrument sounds licensed from Roland in QuickTime 2.x.

== Distribution ==
=== North America ===
- Roland Systems Group U.S.

=== Europe ===
- EDIROL Europe Ltd., London, UK
