= SC 7 =

SC 7 may refer to:

- (35282) 1996 SC7 (SC7 of 1996), an asteroid
- BOT SC07 Speed Cruiser, a light-sport aircraft
- Convoy SC 7, a formation and engagement during the Battle of the Atlantic
- ISO/IEC JTC 1/SC 7, a standardization subcommittee of ISO and the IEC
- The Orca Engineering#SC7, one of the world's fastest cars ever produced, made by Orca Engineering
- Roland SC-7, a synthesizer
- Short SC.7 Skyvan, a British post-war civilian aircraft
- South Carolina Highway 7, a state highway in South Carolina.
- South Carolina's 7th congressional district, a US political division
- SC-07, a subdivision code for the Seychelles—see ISO 3166-2:SC
- SC07, a FIPS 10-4 region code—see List of FIPS region codes (S–U)
- SC7, the reference point for a number of asteroids, such as 5130 Ilioneus, 34420 Peterpau and 15220 Sumerkin
- Southern Cross Seven, a regional Australian television network affiliated with the Seven Network
