= Akai MPK 88 =

The AKAI MPK 88 (Music Production Keyboard) is a hammer-action, 88-key MIDI controller keyboard released by Akai Professional in November 2009. It is the only MIDI controller in the MPK series to feature hammer-weighted keys.

It can be connected to a computer via a bus-powered USB port, or with traditional MIDI cables (in which case an external power adapter is required).

== Controls and features ==
The MPK88 features the following customizable controls:

- 8 short-travel faders: the minimum and maximum range of these faders can be adjusted for more precise control of certain MIDI data types.
- 8 continuous encoders/knobs: the minimum and maximum range of these faders can be adjusted for more precise control of certain MIDI data types.
- 8 buttons: these can operate as a momentary switch, or as a toggle switch to turn a MIDI control code (such as Sustain) on or off. They can also be assigned to functions within a sequencer or DAW.
- 16 velocity-sensitive pads: these are modeled after the traditional MPC-style pads and by default are set up to trigger different MIDI notes that would correspond to different samples loaded inside the user's sequencer software. The pads also support channel aftertouch, where if a pad is held down after the initial strike, the player can adjust the amount of pressure on the pad to produce a variety of different effects. When the Note Repeat function is active while holding the pad down, the sample will play back repeatedly according to the time division set.
- Modulation and Pitchbend wheels: the modwheel can be reassigned to a different controller event.
- Dedicated sequencer/DAW remote buttons: these can be set up to use MIDI, MMC, or both.

As most other controllers in the MPK series, the MPK88 also has a built-in arpeggiator, with the 8 buttons acting as the time division for the beat. When this is active, user-programmed settings for the 8 buttons are ignored.

== Editing parameters ==
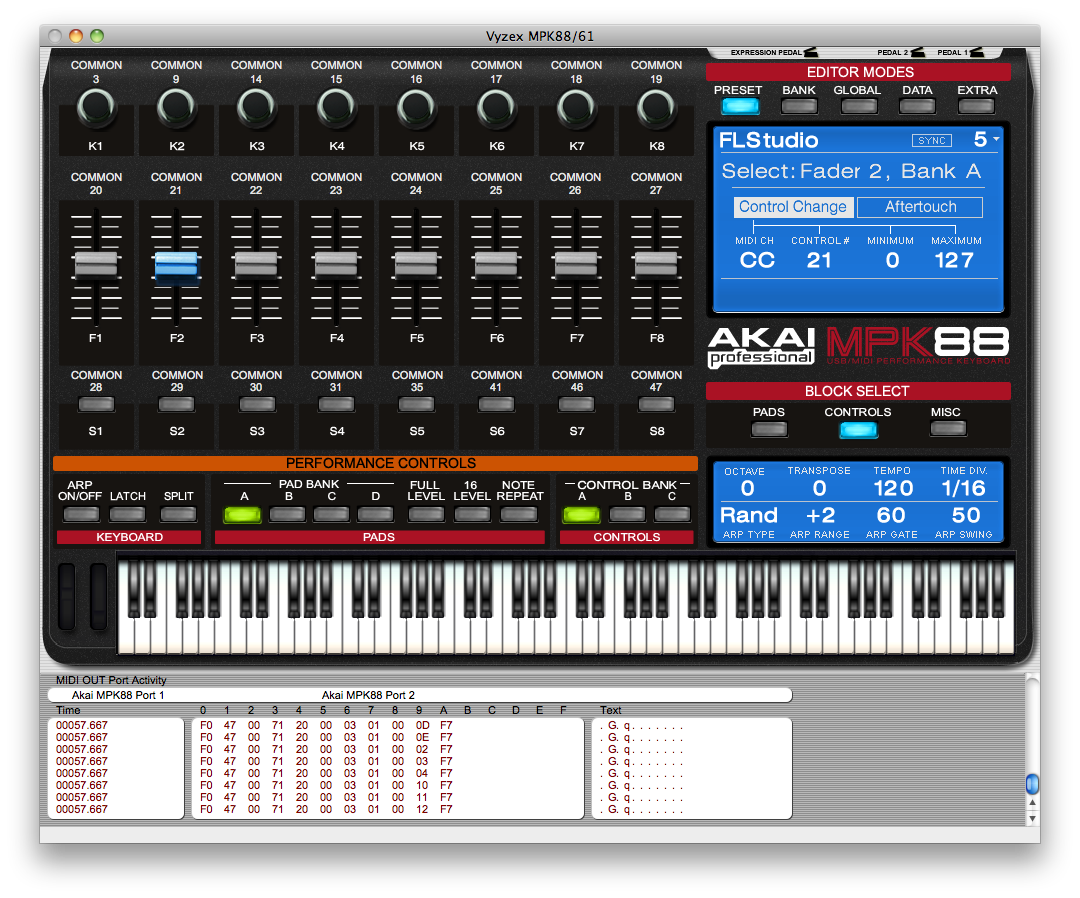
Screenshot of the Vyzex Preset Editor

All of the MPK's controls (with the exception of the pitch-bend wheel) are programmable by the user. These settings can be saved and recalled from up to 30 unique presets. Additionally, there are 4 unique parameter banks for the pads, and 3 parameter banks for the faders, knobs, and buttons.

Editing parameters can be done either on the controller itself, or with the Vyzex MPK preset editor software, which can be downloaded from Akai's website.
