= Creative Wave Blaster =

MIDI synthesizer

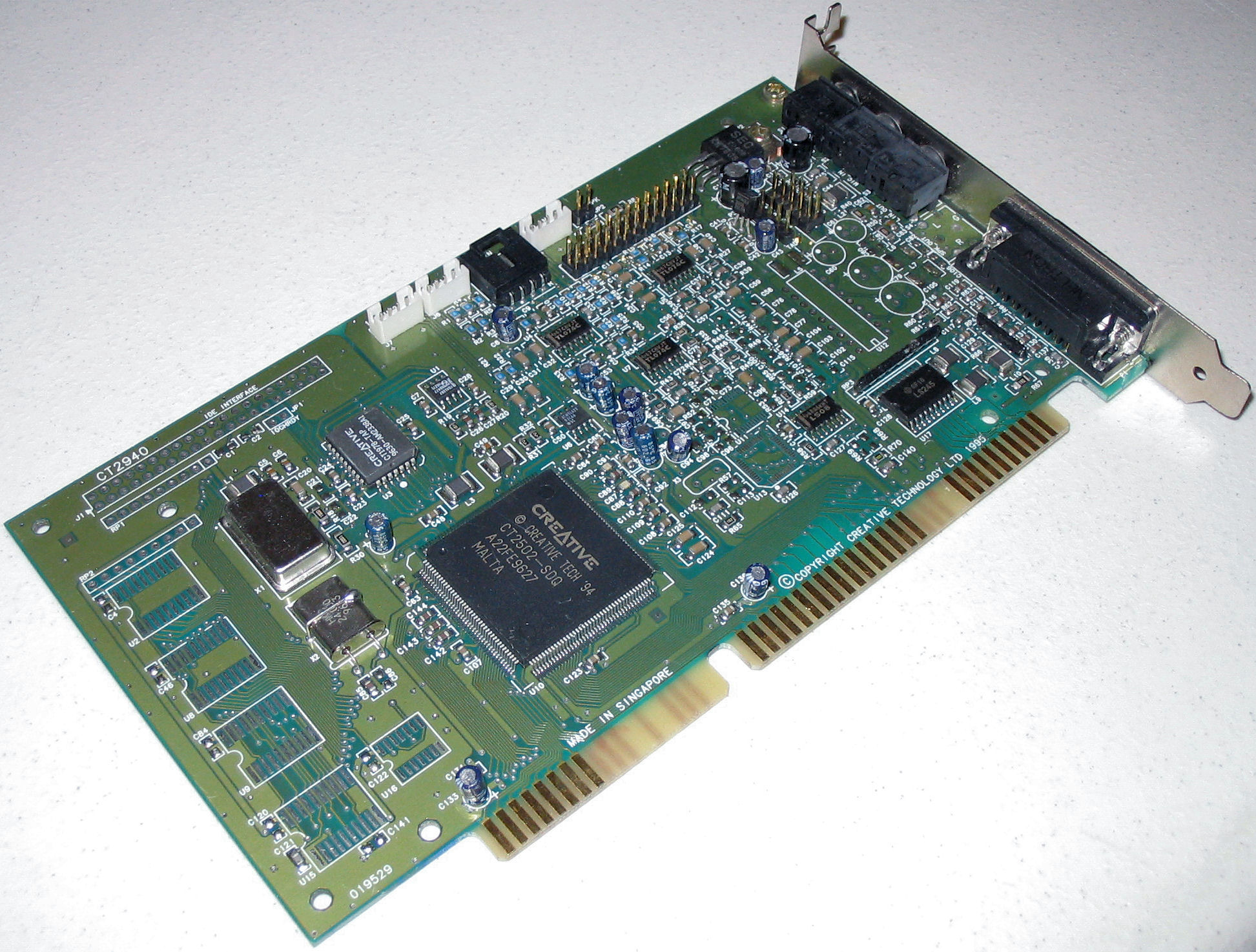
Sound Blaster 16 with Wave Blaster header (top right)

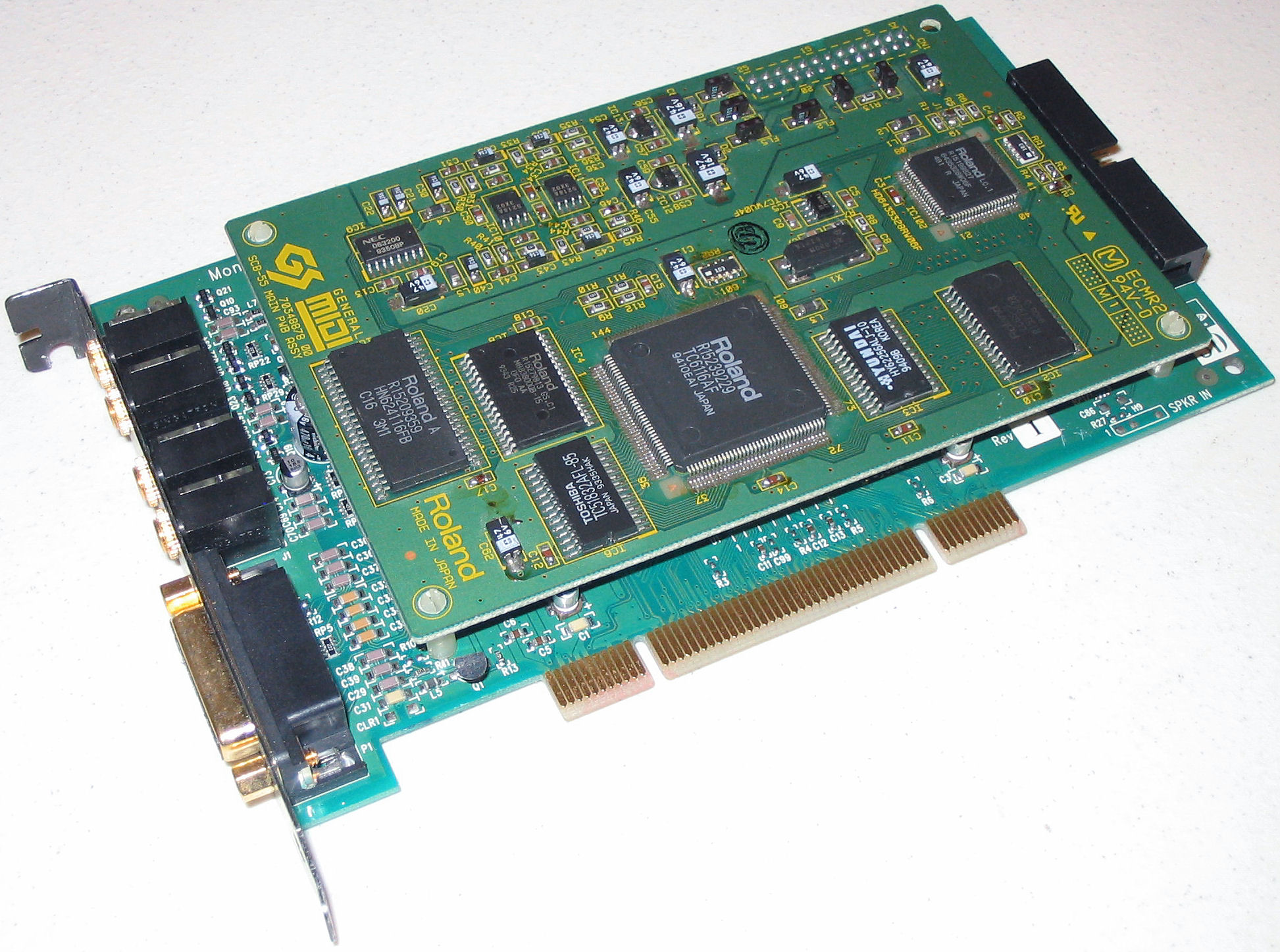
Diamond Monster Sound MX300 with a Roland Sound Canvas SCB-55 daughtercard attached.

The Wave Blaster was an add-on MIDI-synthesizer for Creative Sound Blaster 16 and Sound Blaster AWE32 family of PC soundcards. It was a sample-based synthesis General MIDI compliant synthesizer. For General MIDI scores, the Wave Blaster's wavetable-engine produced more realistic instrumental music than the SB16's onboard Yamaha-OPL3.

The Wave Blaster attached to a SB16 through a 26-pin expansion-header, eliminating the need for extra cabling between the SB16 and the Wave Blaster. The SB16 emulated an MPU-401 UART, giving existing MIDI-software the option to send MIDI-sequences directly to the attached Wave Blaster, instead of driving an external MIDI-device. The Wave Blaster's analog stereo-output fed into a dedicated line-in on the SB16, where the onboard-mixer allowed equalization, mixing, and volume adjustment.

The Wave Blaster port was adopted by other sound card manufacturers who produced both daughterboards and soundcards with the expansion-header: Diamond, Ensoniq, Guillemot, Oberheim, Orchid, Roland, TerraTec, Turtle Beach, and Yamaha. The header also appeared on devices such as the Korg NX5R MIDI sound module, the Oberheim MC-1000/MC-2000 keyboards, and the TerraTec Axon AX-100 Guitar-to-MIDI converter.

Since 2000, Wave Blaster-capable sound cards for computers are becoming rare. In 2005, Terratec released a new Wave Blaster daughterboard called the Wave XTable with 16mb of on-board sample memory comprising 500 instruments and 10 drum kits. In 2014, a new compatible card called Dreamblaster S1 was produced by the Belgian company Serdaco. In 2015 that same company released a high end card named Dreamblaster X1, comparable to Yamaha and Roland cards. In 2016 DreamBlaster X2 was released, a board with both a Wave Blaster interface and a USB interface.

== Wave Blaster II ==
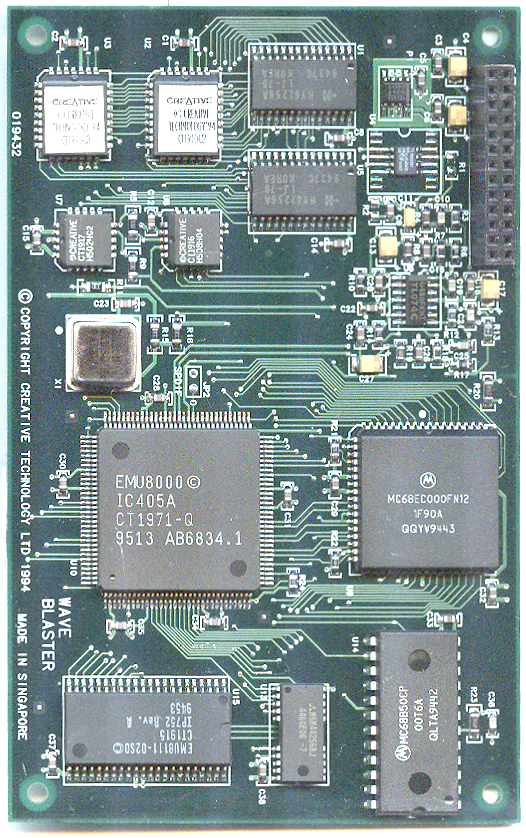
Creative Labs Wave Blaster II

Creative released the Wave Blaster II (CT1910) shortly after the original Wave Blaster. Wave Blaster II used a newer E-mu EMU8000 synthesis-engine (which later appeared in the AWE32).

By the time the SB16 reached the height of its popularity, competing MIDI-daughterboards had already pushed aside the Wave Blaster. In particular, Roland's Sound Canvas daughterboards (SCD-10/15), priced higher than Creative's offering, were highly regarded for their unrivalled musical reproduction in MIDI-scored game titles. (This was due to Roland's dominance in the production aspect of the MIDI game soundtracks; Roland's daughterboards shared the same synthesis-engine and instrument sound-set as the popular Sound Canvas 55, a commercial MIDI module favored by game composers.) By comparison, the Wave Blaster's instruments were improperly balanced, with many instruments striking at different volume-levels (relative to the de facto standard, Sound Canvas.)

== Reception ==
Computer Gaming World in 1993 praised the Wave Blaster's audio quality and stated that the card was the best wave-table synthesis device for those with a compatible sound card.

== Wave Blaster connector pinout ==
Pin	Function	Pin	Function
1	DGnd	2	-
3	DGnd	4	TTL-MIDI input
5	DGnd	6	+5 Volts
7	DGnd	8	TTL-MIDI output
9	DGnd	10	+5 Volts
11	DGnd	12	Audio R in
13	-	14	+5 Volts
15	AGnd	16	Audio L in
17	AGnd	18	+12 Volts
19	AGnd	20	Audio R out
21	AGnd	22	-12 Volts
23	AGnd	24	Audio L out
25	AGnd	26	!Reset

- AGnd = Analog ground
- DGnd = Digital ground
- Some Wave Blaster cards offer audio inputs (Yamaha DB50XG)
- Some Wave Blaster cards offer TTL-MIDI output
- Reset is active low
