= Gajits Music Software =

Former software company

Gajits Music Software, also known as Software Technology Ltd., was a software company based in Manchester, England. The company developed music software for the Atari ST and Amiga in the early 1990s.

== Products ==
- Sequencer One (Atari ST, Amiga; 1990) - MIDI sequencer
- Sequencer One Plus (Atari ST, Amiga) - MIDI sequencer
- Breakthru - MIDI sequencer
- Breakthru Plus - MIDI sequencer
- Sample Series - IFF format sample collection
- CM-Panion - Editor/librarian for the Roland MT-32 and CM-series synthesizers
- 4D Companion - Editor/librarian for Roland D-series synthesizers
- The Hit Kit! - MIDI sequence patterns

== Influence ==
The Atari ST version of Sequencer One was used in the production of the number one single "Your Woman" by White Town.
