= Roland MT-32 =

Roland MT-32 Multi-Timbre Sound Module

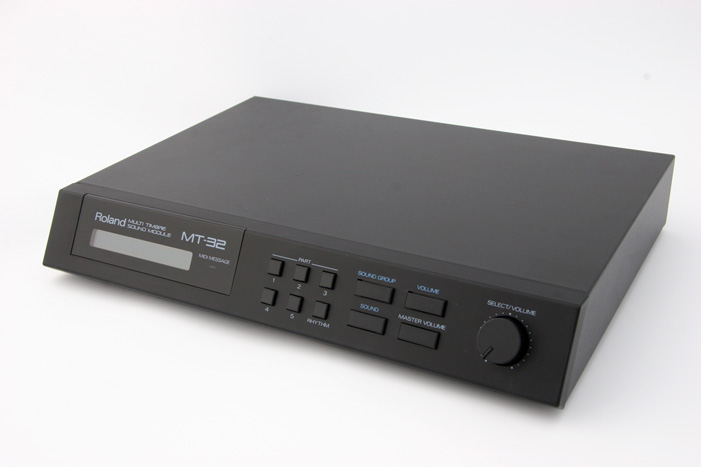
- Front view of MT-32
- Developer: Roland Corporation
- Type: MIDI ROMpler/hybrid synthesizer
- Released: 1987
- Introductory price: US$695 (equivalent to $1,970 in 2025)
- Platform: X68000, X1, Amiga, Apple II, Apple IIGS, Atari ST, IBM PC, PC-88, PC-98, MSX, FM Towns, Tandy 1000, Commodore 64, Macintosh
- Successor: Roland SC-55

The Roland MT-32 Multi-Timbre Sound Module is a MIDI synthesizer module first released in 1987 by Roland Corporation. It was originally marketed to amateur musicians as a budget external synthesizer with an original list price of $695. However, it became more famous along with its compatible modules as an early de facto standard in computer multimedia. Since it was made prior to the release of the General MIDI standard, it uses its own proprietary instruments for MIDI file playback, as well as SysEx messages.

Within Roland's family of linear arithmetic (LA) synthesizers, the multitimbral MT-32 series constitutes the budget prosumer line for computer music at home, the multitimbral D-5, D-10, D-20 and D-110 models constitute the professional line for general studio use, and the high-end bitimbral D-50 and D-550 models are for sophisticated multi-track studio work. It was the first product in Roland's Myuujikun (ミュージくん) line of Desktop Music System (DTM) packages in Japan.

== Features ==
Like the Roland D-50 Linear Synthesizer, it uses linear arithmetic synthesis, a form of sample-based synthesis combined with subtractive synthesis, to produce its sounds. Samples are used for attacks and drums, while traditional synthesis assures the sustain phase of the sounds.

The original MT-32 comes with a preset library of 128 synth and 30 rhythm sounds, playable on 8 melodic channels and one rhythm channel. It also features a digital reverberation effect. Successors (see below) added a library of 33 sound effects. Because of the absence of a piano attack sample, it cannot play a convincing acoustic piano sound.

Sounds are created from up to 4 partials which can be combined in various ways (including ring modulation). With 32 partials available overall, polyphony depends on the tonal complexity of the music, and 8 to 32 notes can be played simultaneously.

The MT-32 by default assigns its parts 1~8 and R(hythm) to respond on input MIDI channels 2~9 and 10 respectively. By consequence, MIDI files using the popular channel 1 or the other channels 11~16 cannot have those parts played on the MT-32. However, the MT-32's melodic parts can be shifted down to respond to channels 1~8 using a button combination or through MIDI system exclusive messages, enabling improved compatibility with non-MT-32-specific MIDI sequences.

Additionally, in 1993 Roland released the "GM2MT" SysEx pack, which can be used to reprogram the MT-32 and compatibles to match General MIDI specifications as closely as possible. 64 of the 128 patches (the limit of possible variations) are completely new or modified sounds, with additional sounds having been added to drum channel 10. Despite this, compatibility with GM is still limited by the lack of parts (9 on the MT-32, 16 per GM specification) and reversed panpot compared to MMA MIDI specifications. The utility was predated by a pack called "MT32GS", released by Mike Cornelius in 1992. The CM-Panion, by Gajits Music Software, was an Amiga editor which worked with the MT-32.

== MT-32 models ==
Two major revisions of the MT-32 were produced. Roland refers to them as MT-32 (Old / Without headphones) and MT-32 (New / With headphones).

Back view of MT-32 (Old)

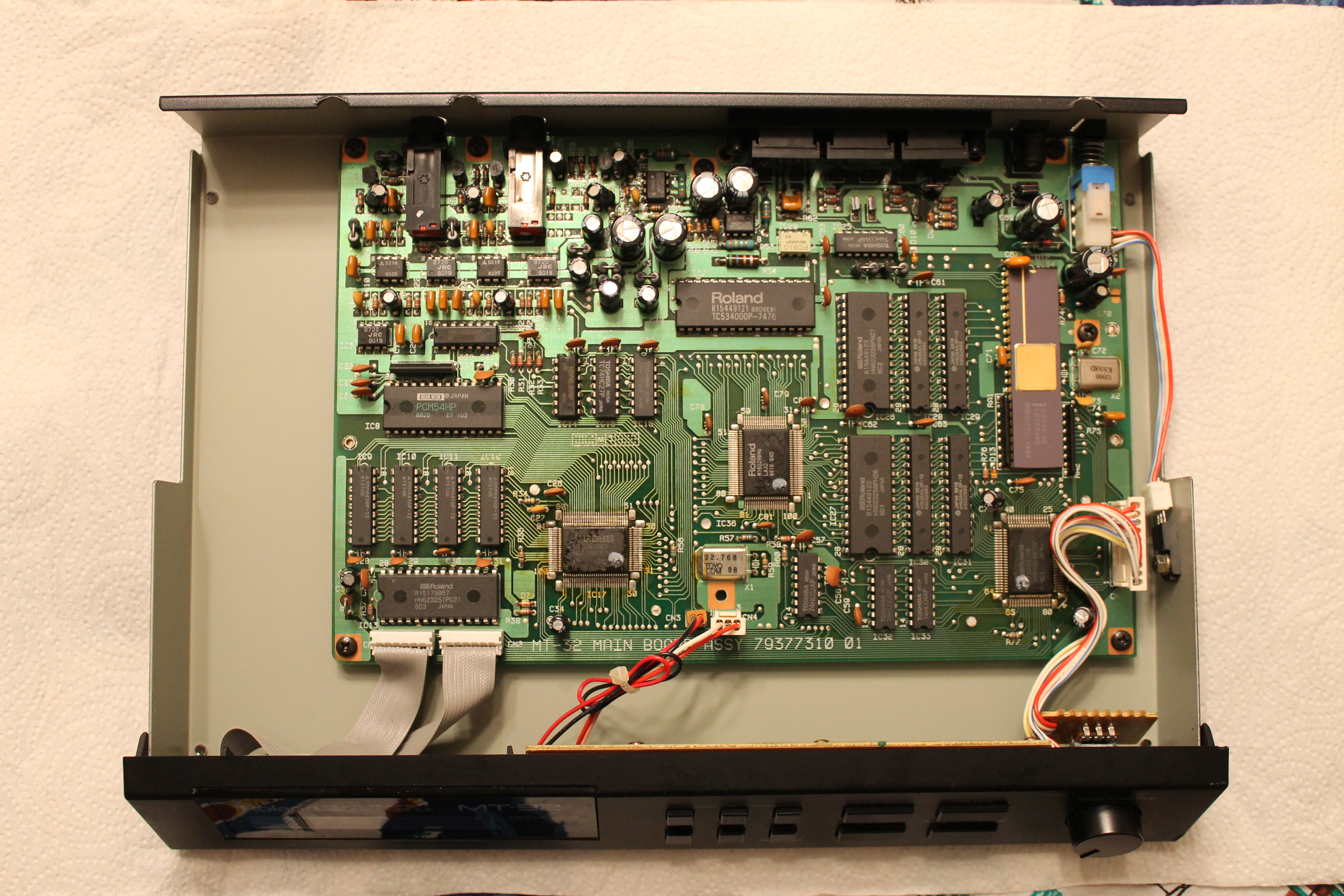
Top view of MT-32 with cover removed (Old, Rev. 1 PCB)

=== MT-32 (old) ===
The LA32 sound generation chip is an 80-pin PGA. The control CPU is an Intel C8095-90 in ceramic DIP-48 package. The digital-to-analog converter (DAC) is a Burr-Brown PCM54; the input signal having a resolution of 15 bits (see below). Line-outs are unbalanced 1/4″ TS phone connector (separate left and right channels.) No headphone jack.

- MT-32 with revision 0 PCB, used in units up to serial number 851399.

The PGA LA32 chip is later replaced with a 100-pin QFP type.

- MT-32 with "old-type" revision 1 PCB, used in units with serial numbers 851400–950499.

Back view of MT-32 (New)

=== MT-32 (new) ===
The control CPU is an Intel P8098. Same Digital-to-analog converter (DAC), but with 16 bits of input signal resolution (see below). A stereo 1/4″ TRS headphones jack is added.

- MT-32 with "new-type" revision 1 PCB, used in units with serial numbers 950500 and up.
- Roland MT-100: Combination of MT-32 and PR-100 (Sequencer and 2.8" Quick-Disk). While it uses a MT-32 (New) PCB, the chassis is different.

MT-32 (Old) that have had the mainboard replaced by Roland because of a repair can contain the MT-32 (New) mainboard, with the headphone jack removed.

== MT-32 compatible models ==
To target computer users, Roland released a number of CM (Computer Music) modules. They came without an LCD and had most buttons removed. Most of these CM modules aside from the CM-32P and CM-300 are compatible with the MT-32 but feature 33 additional sound effect samples which many games took advantage of. These sound effects cannot be heard on an MT-32. Early models share a similar design to MT-32 (New). Control CPU is an Intel P8098 and DAC is a Burr-Brown PCM54.

- Roland CM-32L: Released in 1989, this Roland CM has only a volume knob, a MIDI message and a power-on indicator as external controls.
- Roland CM-64: A combination of the CM-32L and the CM-32P, a cut-down "computer music" version of the Roland U-110. Like the CM-32P, the CM-64 can be expanded with a Roland SN-U110 sound library card (compared to four on the U-110). The CM-32P part plays on MIDI channels 11-16 which are not used by the CM-32L part.
- Roland LAPC-I: ISA bus expansion card for IBM PCs and compatibles. Includes the MPU-401 interface.

In later models, the DAC is a Burr-Brown PCM55, and vibrato is noticeably faster.

- Roland CM-32LN: Sound module for the NEC PC-98 series notebook computers, featuring a special connector for direct connection to the computer's 110-pin expansion port. Released in Japan only.
- Roland CM-500: A combination of the CM-32LN with the Roland GS-compatible Roland CM-300, the "computer music" version of the Roland SC-55. Released around 1992.
- Roland LAPC-N: C-Bus expansion card for the NEC PC-98 series of computers. Released in Japan only.
- Roland RA-50: LA unit with CM-32L ROM (but not all CM-32L samples): Requires software work around or hardware modification to work 100% as a MT-32.

== Sound quality problems ==
Given the MT-32 was intended to be a relatively low-cost prosumer product, many corners were cut in the design of its DAC output. For example, the circuitry needed to properly calibrate the DACs was omitted, resulting in distortion of the analog signal.

Despite having the capabilities of a professional synthesizer module, the noisy output of the MT-32 caused it to be generally considered unsuitable for professional studio use, although it was considered sufficient for use as the sound engine within other Roland prosumer products of the period. For example, the E-20 keyboard internally contains a partially unpopulated MT-32 (New) motherboard, while the RA-50 Realtime Arranger uses a highly modified one. However, an aftermarket modification was available from Real World Interfaces to improve the MT-32's sound quality and generally increase its suitability for professional use.

=== Digital overflow ===
The MT-32 and compatible modules use a parallel 16-bit DAC at a sampling rate of 32,000 Hz. In order to improve the signal-to-noise ratio without investing in higher-quality components, the volume of the digital signal fed into the DAC is doubled by shifting all 15 non-sign-carrying data bits to the left, which amounts to multiplying the amplitude by two while keeping the noise floor constant at the analogue output.

However, if this doubled amplitude exceeds the amount that can be represented with 16 bits, an arithmetic overflow occurs, audible as a very loud popping or cracking noise that occurs whenever the original signal crosses +16384/-16384 (the value of bit 14 lost in the bit shift).

This bit shift is implemented differently between module generations. In first-generation modules, this bit shift is performed at the connection between the data bus and DAC:

Original (non-shifted) data bit #                Connection
--------------------------------------------------------------------------------
15 14 13 12 11 10 09 08 07 06 05 04 03 02 01 00  Output of LA32 synthesizer chip
15 14 13 12 11 10 09 08 07 06 05 04 03 02 01 00  Input to reverberation chip
15 13 12 11 10 09 08 07 06 05 04 03 02 01 00     Input to DAC
|  |
|  +- most significant data-carrying bit
+- sign bit

This means that the reverberation chip will not "see" the overflow noise and thus not reverberate it. However, since bit 14 is dropped completely, the effective resolution is reduced to 15 bits, and since the DAC's least significant bit is not connected at all and thus not changing with the sign, additional one-bit noise is produced, audible at low signal levels.

In second-generation modules, the bit shift is performed at the connection between the LA32 sound generation chip and the data bus:

Original (non-shifted) data bit #                Connection
--------------------------------------------------------------------------------
15 13 12 11 10 09 08 07 06 05 04 03 02 01 00 14  Output of LA32 synthesizer chip
15 13 12 11 10 09 08 07 06 05 04 03 02 01 00 14  Input to reverberation chip
15 13 12 11 10 09 08 07 06 05 04 03 02 01 00 14  Input to DAC
|  |
|  +- most significant data-carrying bit
+- sign bit

This means that the reverberation chip will "see" the overflow noise and thus reverberate it. However, since the DAC's least significant bit is connected and does change with the sign, the sound quality is improved slightly over the earlier implementation.

To prevent digital signal overflow and its audible result, the digital output volume must be kept low enough so that bit 14 will never be used. On the first generation MT-32, this can simply be done by selecting a lower main volume on the unit's front panel, which directly controls the software main volume setting, which in turn directly translates into the amplitude of the digital output signal. On later generation units, this does not work, as the main volume knob and the software main volume setting only modify the volume of the analogue output using voltage-controlled amplifiers and have little effect on the amplitude of the digital signal. To prevent signal overflow, each individual part's volume (controller #7) must be kept low instead.

=== A third-party solution ===
In the period of 1989 to 1993, Robin Whittle of Real World Interfaces offered aftermarket modifications to the MT-32 to address its sound quality issues, as well as improve the functionality of the reverberation unit, provide discrete analog outputs for the internal reverb send and reverb return, and provide battery backup of the MT-32's settings.

According to documentation written in 1990, these modifications were only available for the first-generation MT-32, and not the later "headphone" model or any of the other MT-32 derivatives.

Note that the RWI modifications were intended for those using the MT-32 professionally, and may cause some minor compatibility issues with video game soundtracks intended for a stock MT-32. In particular the changes to the reverb unit functionality will likely cause an RWI modified MT-32 to render reverberation differently from what was intended, with possibly detrimental effects. Additionally an article in the Elektor magazine of December 1990 titled "Digitally controlled mute circuit" by A. Ferndown detailed a mute circuit specially designed for use with the Roland MT-32 module. Article abstract mentions "The mute circuit presented here Is specially designed for use with the Roland MT-32 module, although with some small alterations it should be suitable for use with other makes of expander er synthesizer. lt is intended to eliminate the noise that the expander produces after a note-off. This noise, which remains audible, becomes pretty irritating after a while when the expander is used at home. For studio use a noise gate is, of course, used".

== Compatibility problems ==
First generation units, having control ROM versions below 2.00, require a 40 millisecond delay between system exclusive messages. Some computer games which were programmed to work with the compatible modules (see above) or later ROM versions that do not require this delay, fail to work with these units, producing incorrect sounds or causing the firmware to lock up due to a buffer overflow bug, requiring turning the unit off and on. However, some games were designed to exploit errors in earlier units, causing incorrect sound on later revisions.

Also, some games were written to use instruments not found in the MT-32 models, and require a compatible module, such as a CM-32L, for proper sound playback.

== Music for PC games ==
Despite its original purpose as a companion to other professional MIDI equipment, the MT-32 became one of several de facto standards for PC computer game publishers. Sierra On-Line, a leading PC game publisher of the time, took an interest in the sound-design of its PC games. Sierra secured a distribution deal to sell the MT-32 in the US, and invested heavily in giving its game titles (at the time) state-of-the-art sound by hiring professional composers to write in-game music. King's Quest IV, released in 1988, was the first Sierra title with a complete musical soundtrack scored on the MT-32.

The MT-32 with a necessary MPU-401 interface cost $550.00 to purchase from Sierra when it first sold the device. Although the MT-32's high price prevented it from dominating the end-user market of players, other PC publishers quickly followed Sierra's lead, expanding the role of music in their own game titles with Roland supporting the industry by releasing CM modules for computer users. The MT-32 remained popular for musical composition well into the early 1990s, when the game-industry began to shift toward CD Audio. For a time, it was described as providing "the most realistic sound available in computer gaming today".

The proliferation of the General MIDI standard, along with competition from less expensive "wavetable" sample-based soundcards, led to the decline of musical soundtracks using the MT-32's proprietary features. Games that played General MIDI tracks on the MT-32 initialized the MT-32's sound bank to approximate the General MIDI Level 1 (GM1) specification, but avoided any of the MT-32's hallmark music-synthesis features, adhering to GM1's rather limited set of controllers.

== Emulation ==
Due to the popularity of the MT-32 as a music playback device for computer games, many modern sound cards provide a simple "MT-32 emulation mode", usually realized by way of a sound mapping comprised either of General MIDI instruments rearranged to roughly represent the MT-32's preset sound bank, or of samples directly recorded from the original unit. Later modules like most of the Roland Sound Canvas series, Yamaha MU-series and the Kawai GMega feature such limited MT-32 backward compatibility modes. Results are often considered poor, as the sampling technology used can not reflect the pitch- and time-variable characteristics of the original synthesizer technology, and programming of custom sounds (see above) is not being supported at all. One exception is the Orchid SoundWave 32 card released by Orchid Technology in 1994, whose on-board digital signal processor (DSP) allowed for a more faithful reproduction of the original sound characteristics.

More recently, there have been attempts at emulating the LA synthesizer technology in software using images of the original PCM and control ROMs. The most notable of these emulators is the open-source project Munt, which emulates the MT-32 hardware by way of a virtual device driver for Microsoft Windows, or a virtual MIDI device for OS X, BSD and Linux. It is also incorporated into ScummVM, an open-source adventure game interpreter, as of version 0.7.0. Munt is based on an earlier MT-32 Emulation Project, which was the source of a short-lived legal argument over distribution of the original ROM images with Roland Corporation, who manufactured the MT-32 and claims copyright on the ROM's data.

The Raspberry Pi Single-board computer has an open-source software emulator called the mt-32 pi. This project allows for hardware emulation of the MT-32 by use of additional hardware. The project originally started as an emulation solution for the Roland MT-32 synth module, using the open-source Munt emulation core.

Roland offers emulation of classic synthesizers via the Roland Cloud subscription service. Support for the D-50 was added in June 2017.
