= Sound Blaster 16 =

Sound card by Creative Technology

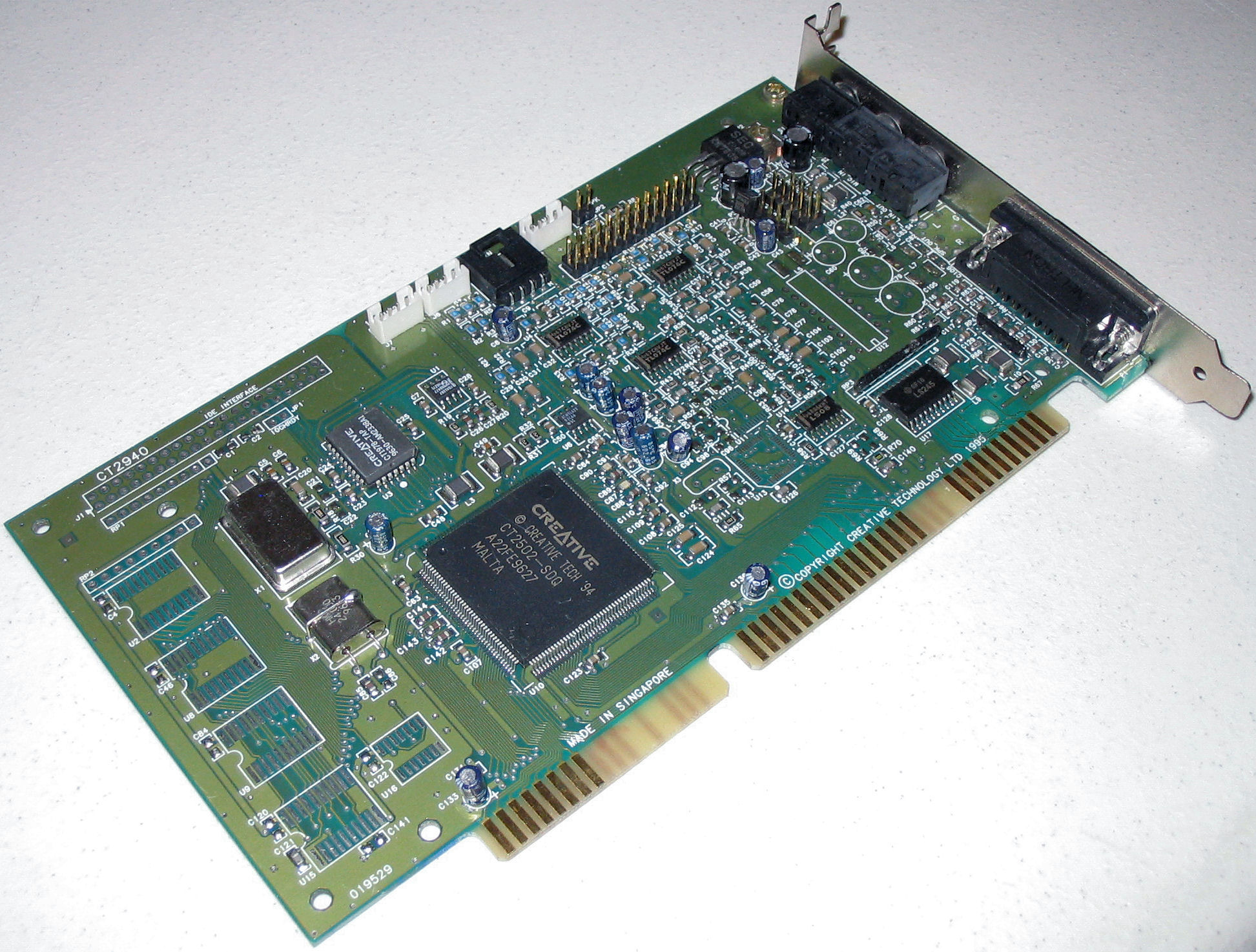
- Sound Blaster 16 (CT2940), without ASP/CSP chip
- Date invented: June 1992; 34 years ago
- Invented by: Creative Technology
- Connects to: Motherboard via one of: ISA Slot; PCI Slot; CD-ROM Drive via one of: ATAPI IDE interface; Panasonic / MKE interface; Sony interface; built-in SCSI adapter
- Common manufacturers: Creative Technology

The Sound Blaster 16 is a series of sound cards by Creative Technology, first released in June 1992 for PCs with an ISA or PCI slot. It was the successor to the Sound Blaster Pro series of sound cards and introduced CD-quality digital audio to the Sound Blaster line. For optional wavetable synthesis, the Sound Blaster 16 also added an expansion-header for add-on MIDI-daughterboards, called a Wave Blaster connector, and a game port for optional connection with external MIDI sound modules.

The Sound Blaster 16 retained the Pro's OPL-3 support for FM synthesis, and was mostly compatible with software written for the older Sound Blaster and Sound Blaster Pro sound cards. The SB16's MPU-401 emulation was limited to UART (dumb) mode only, but it was sufficient for most MIDI software. When a daughterboard, such as the Wave Blaster, Roland SCB-7, Roland SCB-55, Yamaha DB50XG, Yamaha DB60XG was installed on the Sound Blaster, the Wave Blaster behaved like a standard MIDI device, accessible to any MPU-401 compatible MIDI software.

The Sound Blaster 16 was hugely popular. Creative's audio revenue grew from US$40 million per year to nearly US$1 billion following the launch of the Sound Blaster 16 and related products. Rich Sorkin was General Manager of the global business during this time, responsible for product planning, product management, marketing and OEM sales.

Due to its popularity and wide support, the Sound Blaster 16 is emulated in a variety of virtualization and/or emulation programs, such as DOSBox, QEMU, Bochs, VMware, VirtualBox and 86Box, with varying degrees of faithfulness and compatibility.

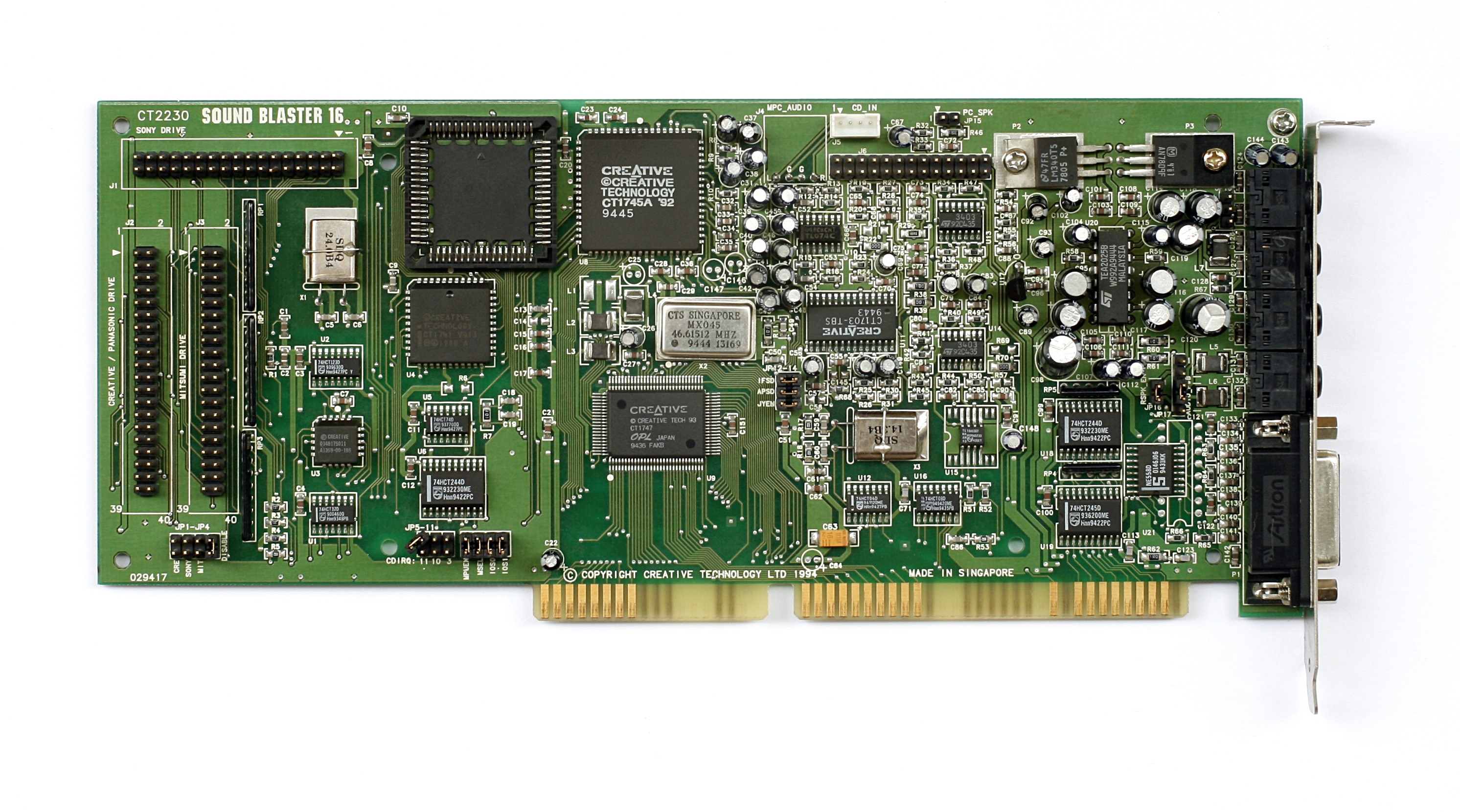
Sound Blaster 16 (CT2230).

== Features ==
The ASP or CSP chip added some new features to the Sound Blaster line, such as hardware-assisted speech synthesis (through the TextAssist software), QSound audio spatialization technology for digital (PCM) wave playback, and PCM audio compression and decompression. Software needed to be written to leverage its unique abilities, yet the offered capabilities lacked compelling applications. As a result, this chip was generally ignored by the market. The ASP was a SGS-Thomson ST18932 DSP core with 16K of program RAM and 8K of data RAM.

The Sound Blaster 16 also featured the then widely used TEA2025 amplifier IC (integrated circuit) which, in the configuration Creative had chosen, would allow approximately 700 milliwatts per channel when used with a standard pair of unpowered, 4-Ohm multi-media speakers. Later models (typically ones with ViBRA chips) used the also then-widely used TDA1517 amplifier IC. By setting an onboard jumper, the user could select between line-level output (bypassing the on-board amplifier) and amplified-output.

Some of Sound Blaster 16 revisions (released in 1994 and later) support Legacy Plug and Play.

=== CD-ROM support ===
Early Intel PCs built after the IBM PC/AT typically only included support for one ATA interface (which controlled up to two ATA devices). As computer needs grew, it became common for a system to need more than one ATA interface. With the development of the CD-ROM, many computers could not support it, since both devices of the one channel were already used. Some Sound Blaster 16 boards (CT2940, for example) provided an additional IDE interface to computers that had no spare ATA ports for a CD-ROM, though the additional drive interface typically only supported one device rather than two, it typically only supported CD-ROM drives, and it usually could not support additional hard drives.

Proprietary CD-ROM standards were also supported by several Sound Blaster 16 cards. Mitsumi (CT2700) and Philips/LMSI (CT1780), for example. Most Sound Blaster 16 cards came with the Panasonic / Matsushita interface, which resembles IDE with the 40-pin connector.

The Sound Blaster with the SCSI controller (SB 16 SCSI-2, CT1770, CT1779) was designed for use with "high-end" SCSI-based CD-ROM drives. The controller did not have the on-board firmware (boot BIOS) to start an OS (operating system) from a SCSI hard drive. Normally that meant that SCSI device ID-0 and ID-1 were not used. As well, if the computer did have a SCSI hard drive with the required SCSI controller, then the settings for the SCSI controller on the SB card had to be selected so that the SB SCSI-2 interface did not conflict with the main SCSI controller.

Most Sound Blaster 16 cards feature connectors for CD-audio input. This was a necessity, since most operating systems and CD-ROM drives of the time did not support streaming CD-audio digitally over the main interface. The CD-audio input could also be daisy-chained from another sound-generating device, such as an MPEG decoder or TV tuner card.

=== OPL-3 FM and CQM synthesis options ===
An example of the considerable differences between OPL-3 FM synthesis and Creative CQM synthesis. 0:00 is OPL-3 FM, and 0:30 onward is CQM.

Sound Blaster 16 cards sold separately feature a CT1747, a chip which has the discrete Yamaha YMF262 OPL-3 FM synthesizer integrated. Some post-1995 cards (notably the CT2910) feature the fully compatible YMF289 FM synthesis chip instead.

Starting in late 1995, Creative utilized a cost-reduced, software-compatible replacement for the OPL-3 FM support termed CQM synthesis. However, its synthesis was far from being entirely faithful to the OPL-3 chips, producing considerable distortion along with high-pitched "squeaking" or "ringing" artifacts in FM-synthesized music and sound effects. Boards utilizing CQM synthesis feature a CT1978 chip, or they may have CQM integrated in the case of ViBRA16C/X-based boards.

=== Models ===
The following model numbers were assigned to the Sound Blaster 16:

- CT12**: CT1230, CT1231, CT1239, CT1290, CT1291, CT1299
- CT17**: CT1730, CT1740, CT1749, CT1750, CT1759, CT1770, CT1779, CT1780, CT1789, CT1790, CT1799
- CT22**: CT2230, CT2290
- CT27**: CT2700, CT2740, CT2750, CT2770
- CT28**: CT2830, CT2840
- CT29**: CT2910, CT2940, CT2950
- CT41**: CT4170

Note: various PCBs with the same model number were shipped with a different configuration regarding CD-ROM interfaces, sockets and presence/absence of the ASP/CSP chip. The following models were typically equipped with an ASP/CSP socket: CT1740, CT1750, CT1770, CT1790, CT2230, CT2740, CT2950, CT2290. The Sound Blaster Easy 16 (CT2750) was sold with the ASP/CSP chip and a parallel CD-ROM port and 1 audio out.

== Sound Blaster VIBRA 16 ==
The Sound Blaster VIBRA 16 was released as a cost-reduced, more integrated Sound Blaster 16 chipset targeting OEMs and the entry-level to mid-range markets. Some variants support Plug and Play for Microsoft Windows operating systems. It lacked separate bass, treble and gain control (except CT2502 chip), and an ASP/CSP socket. Some models even lacked the Wave Blaster connector while others came equipped with the connector. Several different revisions of the VIBRA chipset exist:

- VIBRA16S, the first revision, with an external YMF262/YMF289 OPL-3 or CT1978 CQM synthesis chip. The CT2501, CT2502 and CT2504 chips are ViBRA16S parts. The smaller CT2504 does not incorporate a bus controller, and may depend on external jumpers or a Plug and Play-compatible CT1705 chip for its logical configuration. The larger CT2501 and CT2502 integrate the bus controller.
- VIBRA16C, the next revision, which integrates Creative's CQM synthesis and a Plug-and-Play compatible bus controller into the CT2505 chip. The CT2505 is also featured as an on-board sound chip on some motherboards and on Asus Media Bus cards. This revision has no CD-ROM interface included.
- VIBRA16CL, revision used on VIBRA CT4100 and CT4130 with CT2508 chip. This revision has no CD-ROM interface included.
- VIBRA16X/XV, a much smaller CT2511 chip extensively featured on later WavEffects cards, which also utilizes CQM synthesis. This revision has no CD-ROM interface included.

=== Models ===
The following model numbers were assigned to the Sound Blaster VIBRA 16:

- CT12**: CT1260, CT1261, CT1262
- CT22**: CT2260
- CT28**: CT2800, CT2810, CT2860, CT2890
- CT29**: CT2900, CT2940, CT2941, CT2942, CT2943, CT2945, CT2950, CT2960, CT2970, CT2980, CT2990
- CT41**: CT4100, CT4101, CT4102, CT4130, CT4131, CT4132, CT4150, CT4173, CT4180, CT4181, CT4182

Note: various PCBs with the same model number were shipped with a different configuration regarding CD-ROM interfaces and sockets. Even among the same models variations exist; for example, some OEM-specific cards were made without the TEA2025/TDA1517 amplifier to reduce costs.

== Sound Blaster 16 WavEffects ==
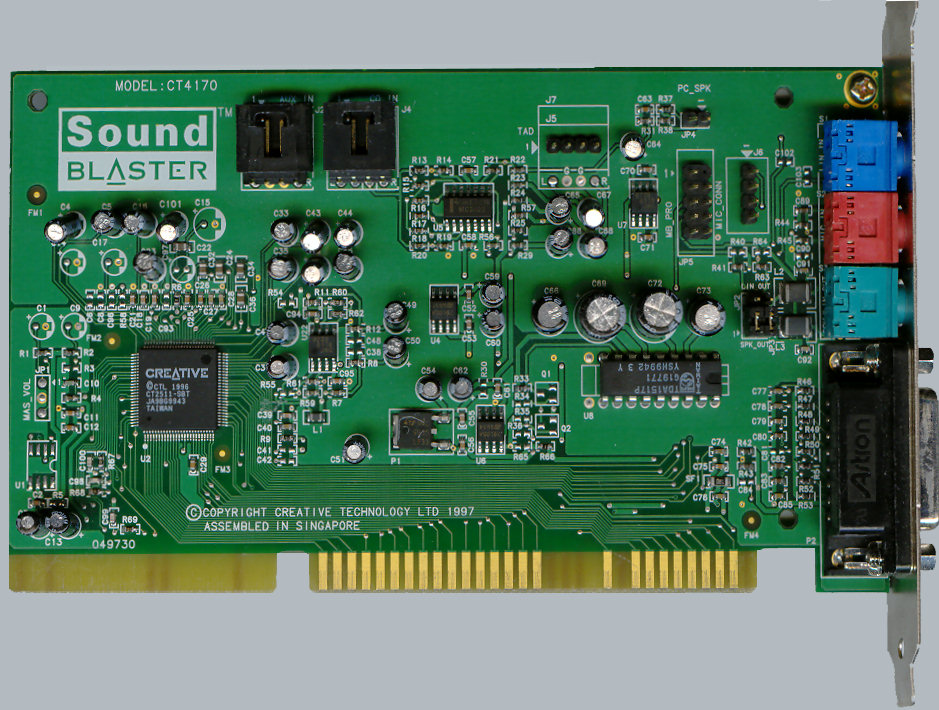
Sound Blaster 16 WavEffects (CT4170).

The Sound Blaster 16 WavEffects was released in 1997 as a cheaper and simpler redesign of the Sound Blaster 16. It came with Creative WaveSynth also bundled on Sound Blaster AWE64 Gold, a physical modeling software synthesizer developed by Seer Systems (led by Dave Smith), based on Sondius WaveGuide technology (developed at Stanford's CCRMA). The WavEffects line also supports CQM synthesis for Adlib/OPL compatibility.

=== Models ===
The following model numbers were assigned to the Sound Blaster 16 WavEffects:

- CT417*: CT4170, CT4171, CT4173

== Sound Blaster 16 PCI ==
In 1998, Creative Technology acquired Ensoniq and subsequently released the Sound Blaster 16 PCI. The Sound Blaster 16 PCI was based on Ensoniq AudioPCI technology and is therefore unrelated to the ISA Sound Blaster 16, Sound Blaster 16 VIBRA and Sound Blaster 16 WavEffects. It has no dedicated hardware for Adlib/OPL support, instead using the Ensoniq sample-synthesis engine to simulate it, though this simulation is considered very inaccurate compared to the original OPL chips. Fortunately it is General MIDI compatible in most games.

=== Models ===
The following model numbers were assigned to the Sound Blaster 16 PCI:

- CT47**: CT4700, CT4730, CT4740, CT4750, CT4790
- CT58**: CT5801, CT5803, CT5805, CT5806, CT5807

== Capacitor and sound quality issues ==
As many Sound Blaster 16s are now around 30 years old, many cards suffer from symptoms related to aging capacitors, ranging from muffled or distorted output to the cards failing to function properly. In addition, with regard to the headphone amplifier design on most boards, Creative did not fully adhere the datasheets' recommendations on component values, potentially impacting the amplified output's sound quality. Some users have found that replacing the capacitors with fresh ones of the recommended values noticeably improved both amplified and line-level audio quality, in addition to restoring proper operation.

== Daughterboard bugs ==
A large number of Sound Blaster 16 cards have a flawed digital sound processor on board that causes various issues with MIDI daughtercards attached to the Wave Blaster header. The problems include stuck notes, incorrect notes, and various other flaws in MIDI playback. The particular Sound Blaster 16 cards that are affected carry DSP versions 4.11, 4.12 and some 4.13. DSP versions 4.16 or later, and older DSP versions such as 4.05 do not suffer from this bug. There is no workaround for this flaw and it occurs with all operating systems since it is an issue at the hardware level. The DSP version can be checked by running the "DIAGNOSE" utility in DOS or looking at the DSP chip on the sound card. A version number is printed on the CT1740A chip usually near the CT1745A mixer chip.

== Reception ==
Computer Gaming World in 1993 stated that "We were not impressed with the quality of the digital audio" of the Sound Blaster 16 or 16 ASP, reporting "pops and extra noise" and incomplete Sound Blaster compatibility. The magazine instead recommended the "almost foolproof" Sound Blaster Pro or the original Sound Blaster.
