= Roland E-20 =

Musical instrument released in 1988

The Roland E-20 is a keyboard instrument introduced by Roland in 1988. It is an arranger keyboard with automatic accompaniment and a liquid-crystal display showing information on the chord and tempo being played. It was designed by Luigi Bruti, who had been working for Siel, a keyboard manufacturer acquired by Roland in 1987.

Described by Roland as an "Intelligent Synthesizer," the instrument was the first product of Roland Europe SpA, which had been set up after a takeover of the SIEL company of Italy the previous year. The new venture was a strategic move by Roland to enter the lucrative high-end home keyboard market which had hitherto been dominated by Yamaha and Technics.

Featuring auto accompaniment, and built in speakers the E-20 used the advanced Linear Arithmetic or "LA" synthesis system as used on the Roland MT-32 sound module. The E-20 set a new standard for the amateur keyboardist, with high-quality sounds, innovative drum patterns and backings which were widely recognised as being significantly more advanced than both Yamaha's PSR and Technics's KN instruments.

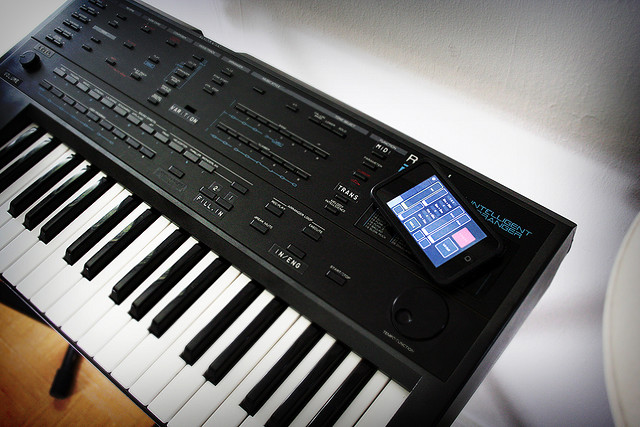
Roland Pro-E Intelligent Arranger (1988-1991)

As well as the E-20 itself, the cheaper E-5 and E-10 were subsequently launched as "cut down" versions, while the enhanced E-30 debuted in 1990. There was also a modular version (the RA-50 Realtime Arranger), and the Pro-E Intelligent Arranger, which was basically half of an E-20, excluding the built-in speakers but including the so-called "intelligent arranger" and drum unit.

In 1989 the German company Quasimidi produced a popular retrofit upgrade kit that significantly expanded the capabilities of the E-20 stock keyboard. It doubled the number of sounds available from 64 to 128 by unlocking hidden patches previously only available via MIDI. It also doubled the number of user programs that could be stored and enabled the layering of two sounds in the right hand section. Another feature was the removal of the system exclusive control on the automatic accompaniment, allowing this to be controlled by other non-Roland keyboards.

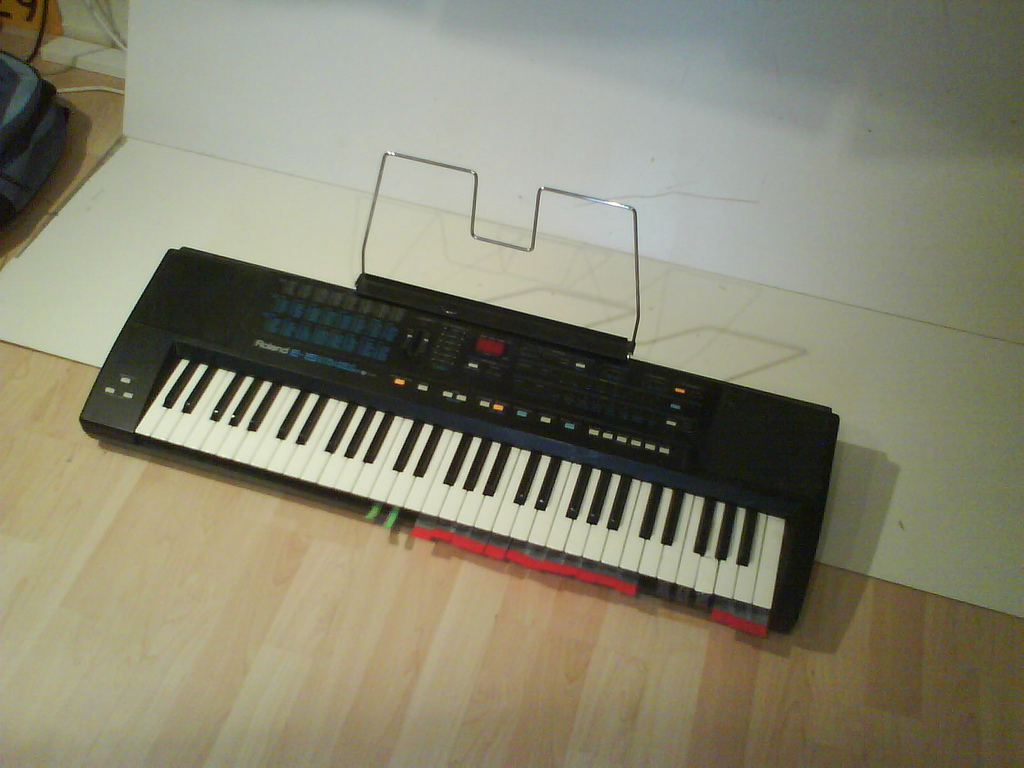
Roland E-15 Intelligent Synthesizer (1991-1993)

Roland went on to dominate the home keyboard market in the 1990s with subsequent generations of the E-series line, introducing other firsts – for example the second generation models (the E-15, E-35 and E-70) were among the first Roland keyboard instruments to feature the Roland GS-standard, having been launched at the same time as the legendary Roland SC-55 Sound Canvas module.

Roland would later introduce the closely related professional G-series line (the G-800, G-1000 and later, the G-70) as what were to become known as "arranger" keyboards began to gain acceptance and recognition within the professional user community. However, all of these products retain the same basic architecture of the E-20.

The current top-of-the-line E-Series keyboard is the E-A7.
