= Japan MIDI Standards Committee =

The Japan MIDI Standards Committee (JMSC) is the body that ratifies and proposes MIDI standards within the Japanese manufacturing and developer community. It now operates within the Association of Musical Electronics Industry (AMEI). The JMSC ratifies MIDI as Japanese Industrial Standards through the Japanese Industrial Standards Committee.

== See also ==
- MIDI Manufacturers Association
