= General MIDI Level 2 =

Specification for synthesizers

General MIDI Level 2 or GM2 is a specification for synthesizers which defines several requirements beyond the more abstract MIDI standard and is based on General MIDI, GS extensions, and XG extensions. It was adopted in 1999 by the MIDI Manufacturers Association (MMA).

== General requirements ==
- Number of Notes: 32 simultaneous notes
- MIDI Channels: 16
- Simultaneous Melodic Instruments – up to 16 (all Channels)
- Simultaneous Percussion Kits – up to 2 (Channel 10/11)

== Parameters ==
=== Program and bank change events ===
General MIDI 2 compatible synthesizers access all of the 256 instruments by setting cc#0 (Bank Select MSB) to 121 and using cc#32 (Bank Select LSB) to select the variation bank before a Program Change. Variation bank 0 contains the full GM — that is, General MIDI 1 — sound set. Variations using other bank numbers are new to General MIDI 2, and correspond to variation sounds introduced in Roland GS and Yamaha XG.

==== Melodic sounds ====
===== Piano =====
Patch Number	Bank Number	Instrument Name
1	0	Acoustic Grand Piano
1	1	Wide Acoustic Grand Piano
1	2	Dark Acoustic Grand Piano
2	0	Bright Acoustic Piano
2	1	Wide Bright Acoustic Piano
3	0	Electric Grand Piano
3	1	Wide Electric Grand Piano
4	0	Honky-Tonk Piano
4	1	Wide Honky-Tonk Piano
5	0	Rhodes Electric Piano
5	1	Detuned Electric Piano 1
5	2	Variation Electric Piano 1
5	3	60's Electric Piano
6	0	Chorused Electric Piano
6	1	Detuned Electric Piano 2
6	2	Variation Electric Piano 2
6	3	Electric Piano Legend
6	4	Phaser Electric Piano
7	0	Harpsichord
7	1	Coupled Harpsichord
7	2	Wide Harpsichord
7	3	Open Harpsichord
8	0	Clavinet
8	1	Pulsed Clavinet

===== Chromatic Percussion =====
Patch Number	Bank Number	Instrument Name
9	0	Celesta
10	0	Glockenspiel
11	0	Music Box
12	0	Vibraphone
12	1	Wet Vibraphone
13	0	Marimba
13	1	Wide Marimba
14	0	Xylophone
15	0	Tubular Bells
15	1	Church Bells
15	2	Carillon Bells
16	0	Dulcimer/Santur

===== Organ =====
Patch Number	Bank Number	Instrument Name
17	0	Drawbar Organ 1
17	1	Detuned Drawbar Organ
17	2	60's Drawbar Organ
17	3	Drawbar Organ 2
18	0	Percussive B3 Organ 1
18	1	Detuned Percussive B3 Organ
18	2	Percussive B3 Organ 2
19	0	Rock Organ
20	0	Church Organ 1
20	1	Church Organ 2
20	2	Church Organ 3
21	0	Reeds Organ
21	1	Puffs Organ
22	0	French Accordion
22	1	Italian Accordion
23	0	Harmonica
24	0	Tango Accordion

===== Guitar =====
Patch Number	Bank Number	Instrument Name
25	0	Nylon-Strings Guitar 1
25	1	Ukulele
25	2	Opened Nylon-Strings Guitar
25	3	Nylon-Strings Guitar 2
26	0	Steel-Strings Guitar
26	1	12-Strings Steel Guitar
26	2	Mandolin
26	3	Steel-Strings Guitar + Body Tapped Sounds
27	0	Jazz Guitar
27	1	Hawaiian Guitar
28	0	Clean Electric Guitar
28	1	Chorus Guitar
28	2	Mid Tone Guitar
29	0	Muted Electric Guitar
29	1	Funky Guitar 1
29	2	Funky Guitar 2
29	3	Jazz Man
30	0	Overdriven Guitar
30	1	Guitar Pinch
31	0	Distortion Guitar
31	1	Feedback Guitar
31	2	Distortion Rhythm Guitar
32	0	Guitar Harmonics
32	1	Guitar Feedback

===== Bass =====
Patch Number	Bank Number	Instrument Name
33	0	Acoustic Bass
34	0	Fingered Bass
34	1	Fingered Slap Bass
35	0	Picked Bass
36	0	Fretless Bass
37	0	Slap Bass 1
38	0	Slap Bass 2
39	0	Synth Bass 1
39	1	Synth Bass 101
39	2	Synth Bass 3
39	3	Clavi Bass
39	4	Hammered Bass
40	0	Synth Bass 2
40	1	Synth Bass 4
40	2	Rubber Bass
40	3	Attack Pulsed

===== Orchestra Solo =====
Patch Number	Bank Number	Instrument Name
41	0	Violin
41	1	Slow Violin
41	2	Erhu
42	0	Viola
42	1	Zhonghu
43	0	Cello
43	1	Large Dihu
43	2	Medium Dihu
43	3	Small Dihu
44	0	Contrabass
45	0	Tremolo Strings
46	0	Pizzicato Strings
47	0	Harp
47	1	Yangqin
48	0	Timpani

===== Orchestra Ensemble =====
Patch Number	Bank Number	Instrument Name
49	0	Strings Ensemble
49	1	Orchestral Strings
49	2	60's Strings
50	0	Slow Strings Ensemble
51	0	Synth Strings 1
51	1	Synth Strings 3
52	0	Synth Strings 2
53	0	Choir Aahs 1
53	1	Choir Aahs 2
54	0	Voice Oohs
54	1	Humming
55	0	Synth Voice
55	1	Analog Voice
56	0	Orchestra Hit
56	1	Bass Hit
56	2	6th Hit
56	3	Euro Hit

===== Brass =====
Patch Number	Bank Number	Instrument Name
57	0	Trumpet
57	1	Dark Trumpet Soft
58	0	Trombone 1
58	1	Trombone 2
58	2	Bright Trombone
59	0	Tuba
60	0	Muted Trumpet 1
60	1	Muted Trumpet 2
61	0	French Horns 1
61	1	French Horns 2
62	0	Brass Section 1
62	1	Brass Section 2
63	0	Synth Brass 1
63	1	Synth Brass 3
63	2	Analog Brass 1
63	3	Jump Brass
64	0	Synth Brass 2
64	1	Synth Brass 4
64	2	Analog Brass 2

===== Reed =====
Patch Number	Bank Number	Instrument Name
65	0	Soprano Sax
66	0	Alto Sax
67	0	Tenor Sax
68	0	Baritone Sax
69	0	Oboe
70	0	English Horn
71	0	Bassoon
72	0	Clarinet

===== Wind =====
Patch Number	Bank Number	Instrument Name
73	0	Piccolo
74	0	Flute
75	0	Recorder
76	0	Pan Flute
77	0	Bottle Blow
78	0	Shakuhachi
79	0	Whistle
80	0	Ocarina

===== Synth Lead =====
Patch Number	Bank Number	Instrument Name
81	0	Square Lead
81	1	Square Wave
81	2	Sine Wave
82	0	Saw Lead
82	1	Saw Wave
82	2	Doctor Solo (Roland MT-32 patch 45)
82	3	Natural Lead
82	4	Sequenced Saw
83	0	Synth Calliope
84	0	Chiffer Lead
85	0	Charang
85	1	Wire Lead
86	0	Solo Synth Vox
87	0	5th Saw Wave
88	0	Bass & Lead
88	1	Delayed Lead

===== Synth Pad =====
Patch Number	Bank Number	Instrument Name
89	0	Fantasia Pad
90	0	Warm Pad
90	1	Sine Pad
91	0	Polysynth Pad
92	0	Space Voice Pad
92	1	Itopia
93	0	Bowed Glass Pad
94	0	Metal Pad
95	0	Halo Pad
96	0	Sweep Pad

===== Synth Sound FX =====
Patch Number	Bank Number	Instrument Name
97	0	Ice Rain
98	0	Soundtrack
99	0	Crystal
99	1	Synth Mallet
100	0	Atmosphere
101	0	Brightness
102	0	Goblin
103	0	Echo Drops
103	1	Echo Bell
103	2	Echo Pan
104	0	Star Theme

===== Ethnic =====
Patch Number	Bank Number	Instrument Name
105	0	Sitar 1
105	1	Sitar 2
106	0	Banjo
107	0	Shamisen
108	0	Koto
108	1	Taisho Koto
109	0	Kalimba
110	0	Bagpipe
111	0	Fiddle
112	0	Shanai

===== Percussive =====
Patch Number	Bank Number	Instrument Name
113	0	Tinkle Bells
114	0	Agogô
115	0	Steel Drums
116	0	Woodblock
116	1	Castanets
117	0	Taiko Drums
117	1	Concert Bass Drums
118	0	Melodic Tom 1
118	1	Melodic Tom 2
119	0	Synth Drums
119	1	808 Toms
119	2	Electric Percussion
120	0	Reversed Cymbals

===== Sound Effect =====
Patch Number	Bank Number	Instrument Name
121	0	Guitar Fret Noise
121	1	Guitar Cut Noise
121	2	String Slap
122	0	Breath Noise
122	1	Flute Key Click
123	0	Seashore
123	1	Rain
123	2	Thunder
123	3	Wind
123	4	Stream
123	5	Bubble
124	0	Bird
124	1	Dog
124	2	Horse Gallop
124	3	Bird 2
125	0	Telephone 1
125	1	Telephone 2
125	2	Door Creaking
125	3	Door Closing
125	4	Scratch
125	5	Wind Chimes
126	0	Helicopter
126	1	Car Engine
126	2	Car Stop
126	3	Car Pass
126	4	Car Crash
126	5	Siren
126	6	Train
126	7	Jet Plane
126	8	Starship
126	9	Burst Noise
127	0	Applause
127	1	Laughter
127	2	Screaming
127	3	Punch
127	4	Heartbeat
127	5	Footsteps
128	0	Gunshot
128	1	Machine Gun
128	2	Laser gun
128	3	Explosion

==== Drum sounds ====
These are the same patch numbers as defined in the original version of GS. Drum bank is accessed by setting cc#0 (Bank Select MSB) to 120 and cc#32 (Bank Select LSB) to 0 and PC (Program Change) to select drum kit.

1	Standard Kit	The only kit specified by General MIDI Level 1
9	Room Kit	Drums recorded with room ambience
17	Power Kit	More powerful kick and snare sounds
25	Electronic Kit	Sounds of various electronic drums
26	TR-808 Kit	Analog drum kit similar to Roland TR-808
33	Jazz Kit	Softer kick and snare sounds than the Standard Kit
41	Brush Kit	Many brush sounds added
49	Orchestra Kit	A collection of concert drums and timpani
57	Sound FX Kit	A collection of sound effects

=== Additional percussion notes ===
These are the same GS drum notes and span Drum Kits 1 to 49:

27	High Q	34	Metronome Bell
28	Slap	82	Shaker
29	Scratch Push	83	Jingle Bell
30	Scratch Pull	84	Belltree
31	Sticks	85	Castanets
32	Square Click	86	Mute Surdo
33	Metronome Click	87	Open Surdo

=== Supported Control Change messages ===
CC	Function
0/32	Bank Select (MSB/LSB)
1	Modulation Wheel
2	Breath Controller
4	Foot Controller
5	Portamento Time
7	Channel Volume
10	Pan
64	Damper Pedal On/Off (Sustain)
65	Portamento On/Off
66	Sostenuto On/Off
67	Soft Pedal On/Off
70	Sound Variation
71	Timbre/Harmonic Intensity (filter resonance)
72	Release Time
73	Attack Time
74	Brightness (cutoff frequency)
75	Decay Time
76	Vibrato Rate
77	Vibrato Depth
78	Vibrato Delay
91	Effect 1 Depth (reverb send level)
92	Effect 2 Depth (formerly tremolo depth)
93	Effect 3 Depth (chorus send level)
94	Effect 4 Depth (formerly detune depth)
95	Effect 5 Depth (formerly phaser depth)
6/38	Data Entry (MSB/LSB)
100/101	Registered Parameter Number (MSB/LSB)

=== Supported Registered Parameter Numbers (RPNs) ===
- Pitch Bend Sensitivity
- Channel Fine Tune
- Channel Coarse Tune
- Modulation Depth Range (Vibrato Depth Range)
- RPN NULL

=== Supported Universal System Exclusive (SysEx) messages ===
- Master Volume
- Master Fine Tuning
- Master Coarse Tuning
- Reverb Type
- Reverb Time
- Chorus Type
- Chorus Mod Rate
- Chorus Mod Depth
- Chorus Feedback
- Chorus Send to Reverb
- Controller Destination Setting
- Scale/Octave Tuning Adjust
- Key-Based Instrument Controllers
- GM2 System On

== See also ==
- Comparison of MIDI standards
