= Downloadable Sounds =

Sound bank standard for use in MIDI synthesisers

- International standard: DLS
- Developed by: MMA
- Introduced: June 1, 1997; 29 years ago
- Industry: Music technology (electronic and digital)
- Website: MIDI.org

Downloadable Sounds (DLS) is a file format specification maintained by MIDI Manufacturers Association (MMA) that outlines how samples and instruments are used and stored with MIDI/DLS compatible synthesisers.

== History ==
=== Ratification and announcements (1996-1997) ===
In May 1996, the MMA announced the DLS format, tailoring it towards optical media and online usages. MMA outlined that this format aims to help game developers input custom soundbanks, overcoming the limitations of the initial Original MIDI specification. The-then president of the MMA, Tom White,, addressed rising concerns of music programmability by saying

“Inconsistent and proprietary designs have stalled the widespread adoption of wavetable synthesis. DLS 1.0 is the industry standard that will make wavetable and MIDI ubiquitous on mainstream consumer PCs. Consumers will experience enhanced interactive sounds beyond anything available today on the PC, and the title composers can rest assured that the consumer will hear exactly what was intended."

— Tom White

This format was developed in collaboration with prominent multimedia companies, including Microsoft, the developer and maintainer of the DirectX specification.
