= Roland GS =

General MIDI standard

Roland GS, or just GS, sometimes expanded as General Standard or General Sound, is a MIDI specification. It requires that all GS-compatible equipment must meet a certain set of features and it documents interpretations of some MIDI commands and bytes sequences, thus defining instrument tones, controllers for sound effects, etc.

In addition to the simpler General MIDI standard, GS defines 98 additional tone instruments, 15 more percussion instruments, 8 more drum kits, 3 effects (reverb/chorus/variation) and some other features.

The Roland SC-55 was the first synthesizer to support the GS standard.

== History ==
The GS extensions were first introduced and implemented on Roland Sound Canvas series modules, starting with the Roland SC-55 in 1991. The first model supported 317 instruments, 16 simultaneous melodic voices, 8 percussion voices and a compatibility mode for Roland MT-32 (although it only emulated it and lacked programmability of original MT-32) and gained explosive popularity.

In addition to the Sound Canvas series, Roland also provided GS compatibility in its own professional lineup through the JV-30 keyboard and the VE-GS1 expansion board for other JV-series instruments. In addition, GS compatibility is provided in the GM2 specification which Roland helped to create and actively supports.

Some other manufacturers attempted to be compatible to Roland GS, but could not use the GS trademark or samples. In Yamaha XG synthesizers for example the GS implementation was called "TG300B mode". Dream S.A. used unlicensed samples of Roland GS instruments and was sued.

== Notable features ==
=== Banks ===
The program in every individual bank will align with the 128 in GM's instrument patch map. The Sound Canvas used additional pair of controllers, cc#0 and cc#32, to specify up to 16384 (128*128) 'variations' of each melodic sound defined by General MIDI. Typically, cc#32 (Bank Select LSB) was used to select a family (i.e. 1 - SC-55, 2 - SC-88 etc.) then cc#0 (Bank Select MSB) was used to set a particular variation bank.

=== Drum kits ===
MIDI channel 10 is used for drums by default like in General MIDI, but they are accessible on any channel through the use of SysEx. Only 2 different drum kits can be used at a time. There are ten different kits in total:

- 1 Standard - the only kit used in GM standard
- 9 Room - features lower-pitched snares and toms
- 17 Power - features gated reverb and louder dynamics in comparison to other kits
- 25 Electronic - emulation of 1980s-style electronic drums such as Simmons, with distinctive synthesized sounds
- 26 TR-808 - Roland TR-808 emulation
- 33 Jazz - features softer kick and snares, typical of jazz drumming
- 41 Brush - emulation of brush drumming
- 49 Orchestra - a collection of orchestral percussion, including timpanis, orchestral snares, gran cassa, and clash cymbals
- 57 SFX - collection of sound effects, which also featured in the GS sound set itself
- 128 CM-64/CM-32L - a kit conforming to Roland MT-32 format

Newer models of Roland Sound Canvas and other GS-compatible Roland synthesizers features additional kits not included in the base GS sound set; these include kits based on various Roland drum machines such as the TR-909, CR-78 and TR-707, as well as various percussion kits comprising both traditional and modern percussions.

=== Additional percussion notes ===
There were 16 additional drum notes that span Drum Kits 1 to 49:

- 25 Snare Roll
- 26 Finger Snap
- 27 High Q
- 28 Slap
- 29 Scratch Push
- 30 Scratch Pull
- 31 Sticks
- 32 Square Click
- 33 Metronome Click
- 34 Metronome Bell
- 82 Shaker
- 83 Jingle Bell
- 84 Belltree
- 85 Castanets
- 86 Mute Surdo
- 87 Open Surdo

=== Additional controller events ===
Additional controller events included in SC-55 and SC-88 were:

- 0 Bank select MSB
- 5 Portamento time
- 32 Bank select LSB
- 65 Portamento
- 66 Sostenuto
- 67 Soft Pedal
- 84 Portamento Control
- 91 Effect 1 (Reverb) Send Level
- 93 Effect 3 (Chorus) Send Level
- 94 Effect 4 (Delay) Send Level
- 98 NRPN LSB
- 99 NRPN MSB
- 120 All Sounds Off
- 121 Reset all controllers
- 123 All notes off

=== SysEx messages ===
There were messages that allowed the user to turn the GS mode on/off, to set effects processor parameters, to change EG envelopes etc.

== Supporting hardware ==
Beginning in 1991, Roland introduced GS support in the majority of its consumer MIDI products.

=== Tone generator modules ===
- FG-10
- FG-1000
- M-GS64
- RA-90
- SC-50
- SC-55
- SC-55mkII
- SC-33
- SC-155
- SC-55ST
- SC-55ST-WH
- SC-55K
- CM-300
- CM-500
- SC-88
- SC-88VL
- SC-88ST
- SC-88Pro
- SC-88STPro
- SC-880
- SC-8850
- SC-8820
- SC-D70
- SD-90
- SD-80
- SD-50
- SD-35
- SD-20
- DS-330 (Boss)
- Yamaha MU50 / MU80 (referred to as TG300B mode)
- Yamaha MU1000EX
- Yamaha MU2000EX
- Dream SAM9703
- Dream SAM9708

=== Synthesizers and electronic keyboards ===
- E-15 / E-35 / E-36 / E-56 / E-70 / E-86
- JV-30 / JV-35 / JV-50
- JW-50
- SK-50 / SK-50IV / SK-88 Pro
- XP-10
- Yamaha Clavinova CVP (since 2004, shared with GM2 sound set)
- Yamaha PSR-S
- Yamaha PSR-SX
- Yamaha S-YXG50 (referred to as TG300B mode)
- Yamaha S-YXG2006LE

=== Sequencers ===
- SD-35
- PMA-5
- MC-80EX (VE-GS PRO expansion board; SC-55, SC-88, SC-88 PRO maps)

== See also ==
- Comparison of MIDI standards
