= MIDI Manufacturers Association =

Organization representing companies working on MIDI and related standards

- Logo introduced by the MIDI Manufacturers Association to represent the MIDI standard
- Formation: 1985
- Website: www.midi.org

The MIDI Manufacturers Association (MMA) is an American non-profit trade organization where companies work together to create MIDI standards that assure compatibility among MIDI products. The MMA was established in 1985 by the original developers of the MIDI 1.0 Specification published in 1983. Since 1985 the MMA has produced 11 new specifications and adopted 38 sets of enhancements to MIDI.

== See also ==
- DLS format
- XMF
