= General MIDI =

Standard for MIDI-based music synthesizers

General MIDI logo from the MIDI Manufacturers Association

General MIDI (also known as GM or GM 1) is a standardized specification for electronic musical instruments that respond to MIDI messages. GM was developed by the American MIDI Manufacturers Association (MMA) and the Japan MIDI Standards Committee (JMSC) and first published in 1991. The official specification is available in English from the MMA, bound together with the MIDI 1.0 specification, and in Japanese from the Association of Musical Electronic Industry (AMEI).

GM imposes several requirements beyond the more abstract MIDI 1.0 specification. While MIDI 1.0 by itself provides a communication protocol which ensures that different instruments can interoperate at a fundamental level – for example, that pressing keys on a MIDI keyboard will cause an attached MIDI sound module to play musical notes – GM goes further in two ways. First, GM requires that all compliant MIDI instruments meet a certain minimal set of features, such as being able to play at least 24 notes simultaneously (polyphony). Second, GM attaches specific interpretations to many parameters and control messages which were left unspecified in the MIDI 1.0 specification. For example, assigning one of the 128 possible MIDI Program Numbers selects an instrument. With MIDI 1.0, the assignment could be to an arbitrary instrument; but with GM, a program number assigns a specific instrument name. This helps ensure that playback of MIDI files sounds more consistent between different devices compliant with the GM specification. However, it still leaves the actual sounds of each instrument up to the supplier to implement; one manufacturer's French horn, say, could be brighter, or more mellow, than another's.

The GM 1 specification was extended by General MIDI 2 in 1999; however, GM 1 is still commonly used. General MIDI was widely supported by computer game developers in the 1990s.

== General MIDI 1 requirements ==
To be GM 1 compatible, sound generating devices (keyboards, hardware or software synthesizers, sound cards) are required to meet the General MIDI System Level 1 performance specification:

Criterion	Requirement
Voices	Allow 24 voices to be available simultaneously for both melodic and percussive sounds (alternatively, allow 16 melodic and 8 percussive voices). All voices respond to note velocity.
Channels	Support all 16 channels simultaneously, each assignable to different instruments. Channel 10 is reserved for percussion. Support polyphony (multiple simultaneous notes) on each channel.
Instruments	Support a minimum of 128 MIDI Program Numbers (conforming to the GM 1 Instrument Patch Map) and 47 percussion sounds (conforming to the GM 1 Percussion Key Map).
Channel messages	Support for controller number 1, 7, 10, 11, 64, 100, 101, 121 and 123; support for channel pressure and pitch bend controllers.
Other messages	Respond to the data entry controller and the RPNs for fine and coarse tuning and pitch bend range, as well as all General MIDI Level 1 System Messages.

== Parameter interpretations ==
GM Instruments must also obey the following conventions for program and controller events:

=== Program change events ===
Demonstration of all 128 instruments.

A General MIDI song from 3D Movie Maker

In MIDI, the instrument sound or "program" for each of the 16 possible MIDI channels is selected with the Program Change message, which has a Program Number parameter. The following table shows which instrument sound corresponds to each of the 128 possible GM Program Numbers. There are 128 program numbers. The numbers can be displayed as values 1 to 128, or, alternatively, as 0 to 127. The 0 to 127 numbering is usually only used internally by the synthesizer; the vast majority of MIDI devices, digital audio workstations and professional MIDI sequencers display these Program Numbers as shown in the table (1–128).

==== Piano ====
- 1 Acoustic Grand Piano or Piano 1 (based on a Steinway D model)
- 2 Bright Acoustic Piano or Piano 2 (based on a Yamaha C7)
- 3 Electric Grand Piano or Piano 3 (usually modeled after Yamaha CP-70)
- 4 Honky-tonk Piano or Piano 4
- 5 Electric Piano 1 (usually a Rhodes or Wurlitzer piano)
- 6 Electric Piano 2 (usually a Yamaha DX7 e. piano 1 preset)
- 7 Harpsichord (often with a fixed velocity level)
- 8 Clavinet

==== Chromatic Percussion ====
- 9 Celesta
- 10 Glockenspiel
- 11 Music Box
- 12 Vibraphone
- 13 Marimba
- 14 Xylophone
- 15 Tubular Bells
- 16 Dulcimer or Santoor

==== Organ ====
- 17 Drawbar Organ or Organ 1 (based on a Hammond B3)
- 18 Percussive Organ or Organ 2 (based on a Hammond B3 with percussion enabled)
- 19 Rock Organ or Organ 3
- 20 Church Organ or Organ 4
- 21 Reed Organ or Organ 5
- 22 Accordion
- 23 Harmonica
- 24 Tango Accordion or Bandoneon

==== Guitar ====
- 25 Acoustic Guitar (nylon)
- 26 Acoustic Guitar (steel)
- 27 Electric Guitar (jazz)
- 28 Electric Guitar (clean, often chorused, resembling a Stratocaster run through a Roland Jazz Chorus amplifier)
- 29 Electric Guitar (muted)
- 30 Overdriven Guitar
- 31 Distortion Guitar
- 32 Guitar Harmonics

==== Bass ====
On synthesizers, samplers and other electronic devices, bass sounds are often set one octave lower than other instruments.

- 33 Acoustic Bass (usually based on an upright jazz pizzicato or an acoustic bass guitar)
- 34 Electric Bass (finger) (usually based on a Fender Jazz Bass)
- 35 Electric Bass (picked) (usually based on a Fender Precision Bass)
- 36 Fretless Bass
- 37 Slap Bass 1 (slap bass 1 and 2 are based on the same Jazz and Precision basses as before)
- 38 Slap Bass 2
- 39 Synth Bass 1 (based on a minimoog bass sound)
- 40 Synth Bass 2 (based on a Yamaha DX7 e. bass 1 preset)

==== Strings ====
- 41 Violin
- 42 Viola
- 43 Cello
- 44 Contrabass
- 45 Tremolo Strings
- 46 Pizzicato Strings
- 47 Orchestral Harp
- 48 Timpani

==== Ensemble ====
- 49 String Ensemble 1 (often in marcato)
- 50 String Ensemble 2 (slower attack than String Ensemble 1)
- 51 Synth Strings 1 (usually roughly based on a Solina String Ensemble)
- 52 Synth Strings 2 (often similar to a Roland JP8 synthesizer, with chorus effect)
- 53 Choir Aahs
- 54 Voice Oohs (or Doos)
- 55 Synth Voice or Synth Choir
- 56 Orchestra Hit (based on a Fairlight CMI orch2 preset)

==== Brass ====
- 57 Trumpet
- 58 Trombone
- 59 Tuba
- 60 Muted Trumpet (based on a trumpet with a harmon mute)
- 61 French Horn
- 62 Brass Section
- 63 Synth Brass 1 (based roughly on an Oberheim OBx synthesizer)
- 64 Synth Brass 2 (usually based on a Yamaha CS-80 or Roland JP8)

==== Reed ====
- 65 Soprano Sax
- 66 Alto Sax
- 67 Tenor Sax
- 68 Baritone Sax
- 69 Oboe
- 70 English Horn
- 71 Bassoon
- 72 Clarinet

==== Pipe ====
- 73 Piccolo
- 74 Flute
- 75 Recorder
- 76 Pan Flute
- 77 Blown bottle
- 78 Shakuhachi
- 79 Whistle
- 80 Ocarina

==== Synth Lead ====
- 81 Lead 1 (square, often chorused)
- 82 Lead 2 (sawtooth or saw, often chorused)
- 83 Lead 3 (calliope, usually resembling a woodwind)
- 84 Lead 4 (chiff)
- 85 Lead 5 (charang, a guitar-like lead)
- 86 Lead 6 (voice, derived from "synth voice" with faster attack)
- 87 Lead 7 (fifths)
- 88 Lead 8 (bass and lead or solo lead or sometimes mistakenly called "brass and lead")

==== Synth Pad ====
- 89 Pad 1 (new age, pad stacked with a bell, often derived from "Fantasia" patch from Roland D-50)
- 90 Pad 2 (warm, based on various Oberheim synthesizers)
- 91 Pad 3 (polysynth or poly, a saw-like percussive pad resembling an early 1980s polyphonic synthesizer)
- 92 Pad 4 (choir, identical to "synth voice" with longer decay)
- 93 Pad 5 (bowed glass or bowed, a sound resembling a glass harmonica)
- 94 Pad 6 (metallic, often created from a piano or guitar sample played with the attack removed)
- 95 Pad 7 (halo, choir-like pad, often with a filter effect)
- 96 Pad 8 (sweep, pad with a pronounced "wah" filter effect)

==== Synth Effects ====
- 97 FX 1 (rain, a bright pluck with echoing pulses that decreases in pitch)
- 98 FX 2 (soundtrack, a bright perfect fifth pad)
- 99 FX 3 (crystal, a synthesized bell sound)
- 100 FX 4 (atmosphere, usually a classical guitar-like sound)
- 101 FX 5 (brightness, bright pad stacked with choir or bell)
- 102 FX 6 (goblins, a slow-attack pad with chirping or murmuring sounds)
- 103 FX 7 (echoes or echo drops, similar to "rain")
- 104 FX 8 (sci-fi or star theme, usually an electric guitar-like pad)

==== Ethnic ====
- 105 Sitar
- 106 Banjo
- 107 Shamisen
- 108 Koto
- 109 Kalimba
- 110 Bag pipe
- 111 Fiddle
- 112 Shanai

==== Percussive ====
- 113 Tinkle Bell
- 114 Agogô or cowbell
- 115 Steel Drums
- 116 Woodblock
- 117 Taiko Drum or Surdo
- 118 Melodic Tom
- 119 Synth Drum (a synthesized tom-tom derived from Simmons electronic drum)
- 120 Reverse Cymbal

==== Sound Effects ====
- 121 Guitar Fret Noise
- 122 Breath Noise
- 123 Seashore
- 124 Bird Tweet
- 125 Telephone Ring
- 126 Helicopter
- 127 Applause
- 128 Gunshot

=== Percussion ===
General MIDI's Percussion Key Map specifies the percussion sound that a given note triggers. MIDI note numbers shown in parentheses next to their corresponding keyboard note.

In GM standard MIDI files, channel 10 is reserved for percussion instruments only. Notes recorded on channel 10 always produce percussion sounds when transmitted to a keyboard or synth module which uses the GM standard. Each distinct note number specifies a unique percussive instrument, rather than the sound's pitch.

If a MIDI file is programmed to the General MIDI protocol, then the results are predictable, but timbre and sound fidelity may vary depending on the quality of the GM synthesizer. The General MIDI standard includes 47 percussive sounds, using note numbers 35-81 (of the possible 128 numbers from 0–127), as follows:

- 35 Acoustic Bass Drum or Low Bass Drum (B1)
- 36 Electric Bass Drum or High Bass Drum (C2)
- 37 Side Stick (C#2)
- 38 Acoustic Snare (D2)
- 39 Hand Clap (Eb2)
- 40 Electric Snare or Rimshot (E2)
- 41 Low Floor Tom (F2)
- 42 Closed Hi-hat(F#2)
- 43 High Floor Tom(G2)
- 44 Pedal Hi-hat (Ab2)
- 45 Low Tom (A2)
- 46 Open Hi-hat (Bb2)
- 47 Low-Mid Tom (B2)
- 48 High-Mid Tom (C3)
- 49 Crash Cymbal 1 (C#3)
- 50 High Tom (D3)
- 51 Ride Cymbal 1 (Eb3)
- 52 Chinese Cymbal (E3)
- 53 Ride Bell (F3)
- 54 Tambourine (F#3)
- 55 Splash Cymbal (G3)
- 56 Cowbell (Ab3)
- 57 Crash Cymbal 2 (A3)
- 58 Vibraslap (Bb3)
- 59 Ride Cymbal 2 (B3)
- 60 High Bongo (C4 - middle C)
- 61 Low Bongo (C#4)
- 62 Mute High Conga (D4)
- 63 Open High Conga (Eb4)
- 64 Low Conga (E4)
- 65 High Timbale (F4)
- 66 Low Timbale (F#4)
- 67 High Agogô (G4)
- 68 Low Agogô (Ab4)
- 69 Cabasa (A4)
- 70 Maracas (Bb4)
- 71 Short Whistle (B4)
- 72 Long Whistle (C5)
- 73 Short Güiro (C#5)
- 74 Long Güiro (D5)
- 75 Claves (Eb5)
- 76 High Woodblock (E5)
- 77 Low Woodblock (F5)
- 78 Mute Cuíca (F#5)
- 79 Open Cuíca (G5)
- 80 Mute Triangle (Ab5)
- 81 Open Triangle (A5)

The standard does not specify program change numbers for different drum sets.

=== Controller events ===
In MIDI, adjustable parameters for each of the 16 possible MIDI channels may be set with the Control Change (CC) message, which has a Control Number parameter and a Control Value parameter (expressed in a range from 0 to 127). GM also specifies which operations should be performed by multiple Control Numbers.

CC	Function
0	Pitch bend (MSB/LSB)
1	Modulation wheel
7	Channel volume
10	Channel pan
11	Expression controller
64	Sustain pedal
66	Sostenuto pedal
67	Soft pedal
121	Reset all controllers
123	All notes off/on

=== RPN ===
GM defines several Registered Parameters, which act like Controllers but are addressed in a different way. In MIDI, every Registered Parameter is assigned a Registered Parameter Number or RPN. Registered Parameters are usually called RPNs for short.

Setting Registered Parameters requires sending (numbers are decimal):

1. two Control Change messages using Control Numbers 101 and 100 to select the parameter, followed by
2. any number of Data Entry messages of one or two bytes (MSB = Controller #6, LSB = Controller #38), and finally
3. an "End of RPN" message

The following global Registered Parameter Numbers (RPNs) are standardized (the parameter is specified by RPN LSB/MSB pair and the value is set by Data Entry LSB/MSB pair):

- 0,0 Pitch bend range
- 1,0 Channel Fine tuning
- 2,0 Channel Coarse tuning

An example of an RPN control sequence to set coarse tuning to A440 (parm 2, value 64) is 101:0, 100:2, 6:64, 101:127, 100:127.

=== System Exclusive messages ===
Two GM System Exclusive ("SysEx") messages are defined: one to enable and disable General MIDI compatibility mode (for synthesizers that also have non-GM modes); and the other to set the synthesizer's master volume.

== GS extensions ==
Roland GS is a superset of the General MIDI standard that added several proprietary extensions. The most notable addition was the ability to address multiple banks of programs (instrument sounds) by using an additional pair of Bank Select controllers to specify up to 16384 "variation" sounds (cc#0 is Bank Select MSB, and cc#32 is Bank Select LSB). Other most notable features were 9 Drum kits with 14 additional drum sounds each, simultaneous Percussion Kits – up to 2 (Channels 10/11), Control Change messages for controlling the send level of sound effect blocks (cc#91-94), entering additional parameters (cc#98-101), portamento, sostenuto, soft pedal (cc#65-67), and model-specific SysEx messages for setting various parameters of the synth engine. The 14 additional drum sounds are numbered 27-34 and 82–87, bracketing the 47 General MIDI standard sounds numbered 35–81, and are as follows:

- 27 High Q or Filter Snap (Eb1)
- 28 Slap Noise (E1)
- 29 Scratch Push (F1)
- 30 Scratch Pull (F#1)
- 31 Drum sticks (G1)
- 32 Square Click (Ab1)
- 33 Metronome Click (A1)
- 34 Metronome Bell (Bb1)
- 82 Shaker (Bb5)
- 83 Jingle Bell (B5)
- 84 Belltree (C6)
- 85 Castanets (C#6)
- 86 Mute Surdo (D6)
- 87 Open Surdo (Eb6)

GS was introduced in 1991 with the Roland Sound Canvas line, which was also Roland's first General MIDI synth module.

== XG extensions ==
Yamaha XG is a superset of the General MIDI standard that added several proprietary extensions. The most notable additions were the 352 added instruments and 32 notes polyphony.

XG was introduced in 1994 with the Yamaha MU-series line of sound modules and PSR line of digital keyboards.

== General MIDI Level 2 ==
In 1999, the official GM standard was updated to include more controllers, patches, RPNs and SysEx messages, in an attempt to reconcile the conflicting and proprietary Roland GS and Yamaha XG additions. Here's a quick overview of the GM2 changes in comparison to GM/GS:

- Number of Notes – minimum 32 simultaneous notes
- Simultaneous Percussion Kits – up to 2 (Channels 10/11)
- Up to 16384 variation banks are allowed, each containing a version of the 128 Melodic Sounds (the exact use of these banks is up to the individual manufacturer.)
- 9 GS Drum kits are included
- Additional Control Change introduced, called "Sound Controllers 1–10":

CC	Default function
70	Sound Variation
71	Timbre/Harmonic Intensity (filter resonance)
72	Release Time
73	Attack Time
74	Brightness (cutoff frequency)

CC	Default function
75	Decay Time
76	Vibrato Rate
77	Vibrato Depth
78	Vibrato Delay
79	Metronome Rate

- Registered Parameter Numbers (RPNs)
  - Modulation Depth Range (Vibrato Depth Range)
- Universal SysEx messages
  - Master Volume, Fine Tuning, Coarse Tuning
  - Reverb Type, Time
  - Chorus Type, Mod Rate, Mod Depth, Feedback, Send to Reverb
  - Controller Destination Setting
  - Scale/Octave Tuning Adjust
  - Key-Based Instrument Controllers
  - GM2 System On SysEx message

Additional melodic instruments can be accessed by setting CC#0 to 121 and then using CC#32 to select the bank before a Program Change.

== See also ==
- Comparison of MIDI standards

== Official MIDI Standards Organizations ==
- MIDI Manufacturers Association (MMA) – Source for English-language MIDI specs
- Association of Musical Electronics Industry (AMEI) -Source for Japanese-language MIDI specs
