= John S. Bowen (sound designer) =

American sound designer

Bowen, John Scott
- Occupation: Sound designer

John Scott Bowen is an American sound designer known for his early work with synthesizers.

== Moog and Sequential Circuits ==
Bowen started out as the first official Moog clinician in 1973, demonstrating and contributing to designs for Moog Music. In 1976 he started working with Dave Smith to promote his Model 800 sequencer, and then helped specify the Model 700 Programmer. This association led to the development of the Prophet 5, and then on to the entire line of Sequential Circuits products. Bowen was responsible for the original 40 factory programs of the Prophet 5, and as Sequential's Product Specialist created 99% of all of the factory sounds and sequences (as well as the original Prophet VS waveshapes), also contributing to the User Interface (UI) design for the following Sequential products: Prophet 5, Prophet 10, Prophet 600, Prophet T-8, Prophet VS, Drumtraks, 6-Trak, MultiTrak, Tom, Max, Studio 440, and the Prophet 2000 and 3000 libraries.

== Nielsen Pearson ==
Also during this time, Bowen was bassist and synthesist for the Nielsen Pearson band (1974–1980), performing on 3 albums with them. He also assisted Billy Cobham in setting up his Moog Modular 55 for various recording sessions (one being Stanley Clarke's 'School Days'), as well as appearing on several other projects, most notably with Herbie Hancock for the Eddie Henderson release, Mahal (Capitol, 1978).

== From Yamaha to Korg ==
At the end of 1987, Sequential was bought by Yamaha. After a brief stint there, the Sequential design team moved over to Korg, where John was product manager for the Wavestation series (keyboard, AD, and SR racks, 1989–1992). In 1993 he became part of the original Korg OASYS project team, culminating with the first public presentations of the OASYS keyboard at NAMM and Musik Messe in early '96. After the cancellation of the project in September, 1996, John took part in the Korg Z1 voicing. A year later, with the go-ahead from Korg Japan to resurrect the OASYS technology, he found himself back doing UI design for OASYS PCI synths and effects.

== Creamware ==
In August 1998 Bowen joined Creamware to develop the Modular system used in Pulsar/SCOPE, as well as assisting in some of their other synth design projects. Now working as an independent, he was involved in doing some of the OASYS PCI factory voicing, as well as consulted for Native Instruments in their emulation of a Prophet 5 (called the Pro-52), a VST Virtual Instrument. Later, he helped complete representations of the Pro One and Prophet 5 for the Creamware series of audio cards.

== Zarg Music ==
Bowen departed Creamware and, after a short consulting assignment with Native Instruments, announced his own software synth company, Zarg Music, in November 1999. He developed and released a bundle of four software synthesizers for the SCOPE platform by June of the following year. These software synthesizers were the beginnings of what would become a new Bowen hardware synthesizer design.

== Solaris and John Bowen Synth Design ==
At the 2007 Musikmesse show, Bowen showed a prototype of a new original Bowen-designed keyboard synthesizer named Solaris, to be manufactured in cooperation with Sonic Core and released under the John Bowen Synth Design brand, and eventually Solaris was released.
