= Prophet 2000 =

Sampler

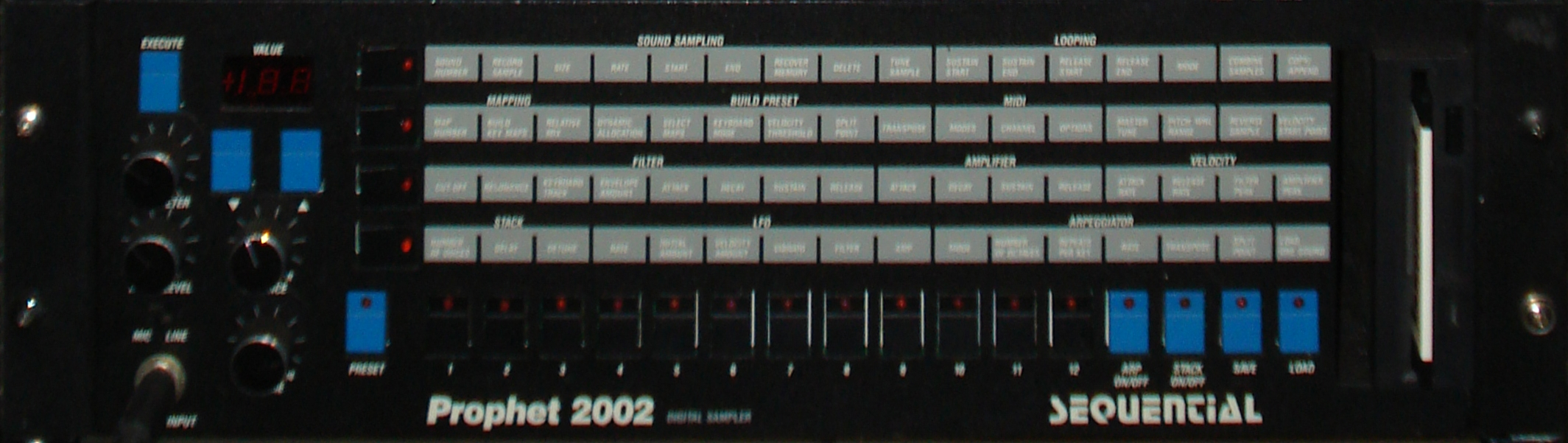
- Prophet 2002 (rack-mounted version)
- Manufacturer: Sequential Circuits
- Dates: 1985–1987
- Price: £2,000 (approx.)

Technical specifications
- Polyphony: 8
- Timbrality: Multitimbral
- Synthesis type: Sample + Analog
- Filter: 8 analog VCFs
- Attenuator: 8 analog ADSR envelope generator
- Velocity expression: Yes
- Storage memory: 256 kilowords (expandable to 512)

Input/output
- Keyboard: 61 keys
- External control: MIDI

The Prophet 2000 is a sampler keyboard manufactured by Dave Smith's Sequential Circuits (SCI) and released in 1985. It was the company's first sampler, and, despite its low audio fidelity and technical limitations by modern standards, marked a shift toward affordable samplers with better audio quality than its predecessors. It is also considered to be one of the earliest multitimbral samplers.

Using the technology developed for the 2000, Sequential also produced the Prophet 2002, a rack-mounted version of the 2000, and the Studio 440, a drum machine and sequencer that used a similar sampler at its core. The Prophet 3000, a rack-mounted elaboration upon the 2000 and 2002, was released in limited quantities prior to the collapse of Sequential.

== Development and introduction ==
The Prophet 2000 was preceded by early samplers such as the Ensoniq Mirage and the E-mu Emulator, which both helped to introduce samplers into general markets. This was in part due to their incorporation of manipulation techniques familiar to users of analog synthesizers. However, these samplers operated at low fidelity with only 8 bits of depth. The Emulator II was also an expensive machine at the time. The Prophet 2000 introduced a higher audio resolution, at 12 bits, and retailed for about £2,000, making it relatively affordable.

The Prophet 2000 was first demonstrated at the Italian Music Fair in Milan. It was presented in the United Kingdom one month following its introduction; public release came in 1985.

== Features ==
Intended to represent Sequential's first entry into the low-cost digital sampler market, the Prophet 2000 was equipped with 256 kilowords of sample memory (word length of 12 bits = 1 sample), and sampling rates of 15.625, 31.250, and 41.667 kHz at 12-bit audio resolution. External storage was available through 3.5" diskettes. The Prophet 2000 featured MIDI (in, out, and thru), 8-voice polyphony, up to 8 layers, and an arpeggiator. Despite their technological limitations, early digital samplers like the Prophet 2000 are noted for their warm audio quality as a result of using analog VCFs and VCAs.

Feedback was presented through a small LED display, which was typical for contemporary machines. The Prophet 2000 introduced features to enhance its looping capabilities, which resulted in easier use and reduction in clicking at the end of a loop. Like Casio CZ synthesizers of the time, the Prophet 2000 was also multitimbral, making it possible for multiple samples to be triggered off its keyboard at one time.

While playing high frequencies, the Prophet 2000 had a tendency to fall out of tune. This flaw was common in many early Sequential products. Engineer Chris Meyer corrected this issue for the Prophet VS, the first digital synthesizer given the green light by Sequential founder Dave Smith.

== Legacy ==
Due to the success of the Prophet 2000, Sequential introduced a rack-mounted version of the Prophet 2000 a few months after its initial release. The Prophet 2002 expanded the 2000s memory to 512 kilowords. At the time, this memory capacity was remarkable, although it would soon be matched by other products. The 2002 also added some features to make the unit more responsive and accessible. One year later, Sequential increased the Prophet sampler's bit depth to 16 with the rack-mounted Prophet 3000. However, the 3000 was only manufactured in limited quantities as its release coincided with the gradual collapse of Sequential Circuits. It is estimated that approximately 250 were produced before Yamaha's acquisition of Sequential.

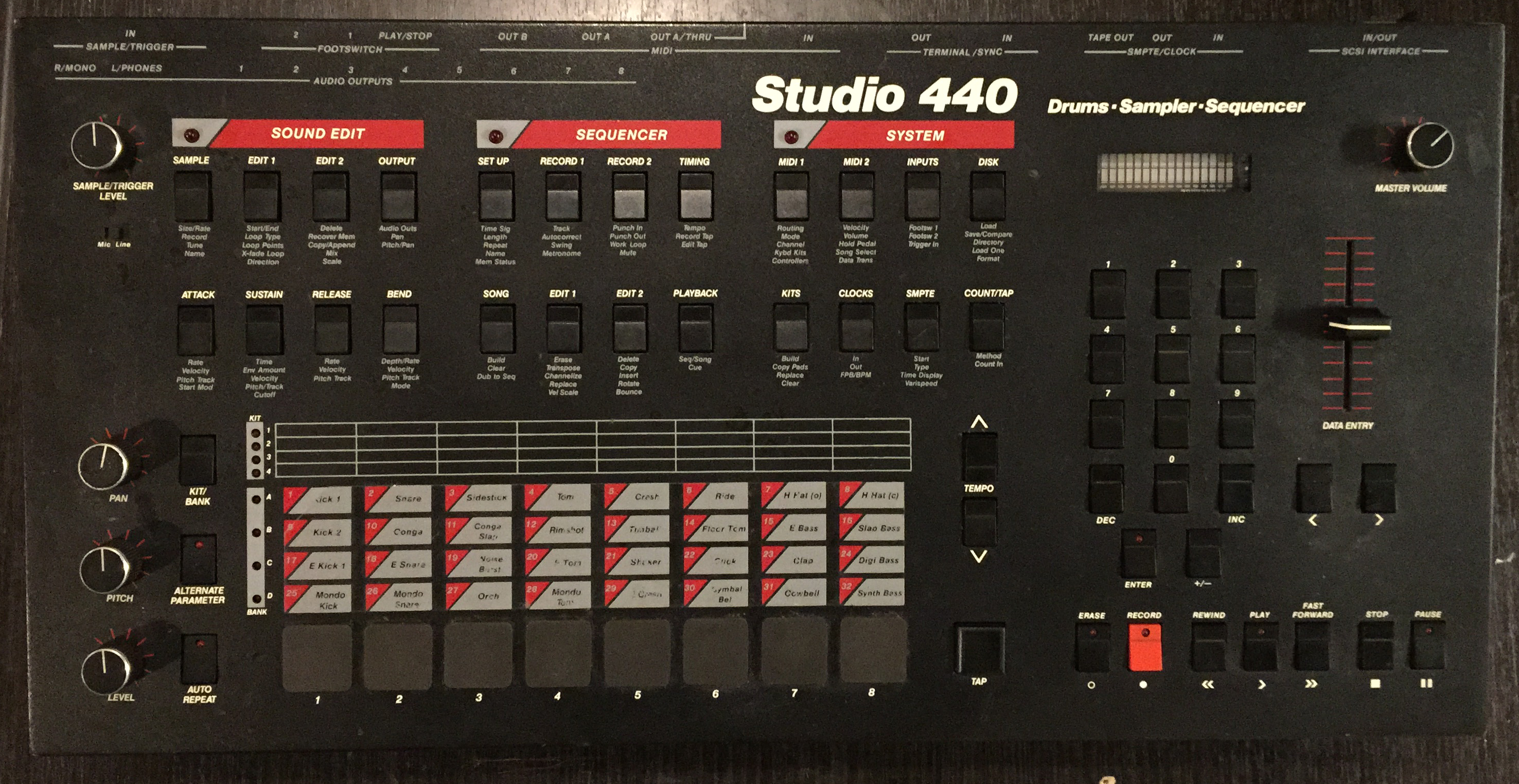
Studio 440 (1987)

In 1987, Sequential introduced a follow-up to the Prophet 2000, the Studio 440. Instead of a keyboard, the Studio 440 used a drum machine format and included a sequencer. The 440 also made it easier to access the full 512 kilowords of available memory by allowing the creation of samples as long as 12 seconds. Like the Prophet 3000, the Studio 440—and many of Sequential's products—lost sales due to the brand loyalty demanded by its competitors, including Akai Professional, Roland Corporation, and Korg.

== See also ==
- Sequential Circuits Prophet-5, an analog synthesizer in the Prophet series
- Yamaha A Series sampler
