= Sequential Circuits Studio 440 =

Drum machine sampler

Studio 440
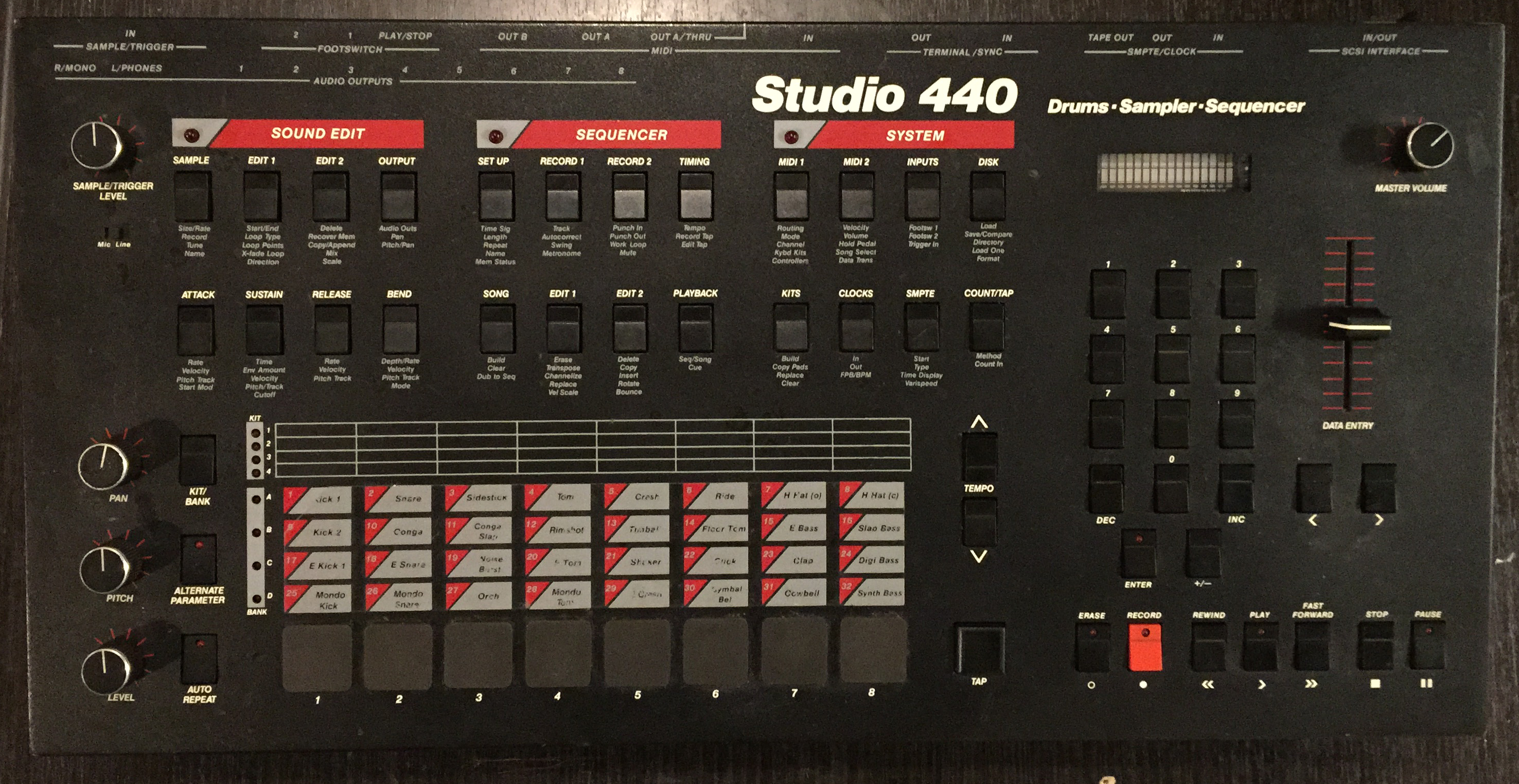
- Studio 440
- Manufacturer: Sequential Circuits
- Dates: 1986-1987
- Price: US$5,000 (approx.)

Technical specifications
- Polyphony: 8 voices
- Timbrality: 8 parts
- Oscillator: 2
- LFO: 1 (saw up, saw down, square, triangle)
- Synthesis type: Sampler Subtractive
- Filter: Analog Low pass non-resonant filter with envelope
- Attenuator: Attack-decay-sustain-release
- Velocity expression: Yes
- Storage memory: 768 KB
- Effects: None

Input/output
- Keyboard: 8 pads
- External control: MIDI

The Studio 440 was a sampler, sequencer, and 32 sound drum machine manufactured by Dave Smith's Sequential Circuits (SCI) and released in 1986. The sampler's core is similar to that of the Prophet 2000 and Prophet 2002. There is a 3.5" floppy disk drive to store samples and data.

== Sample rate ==
The 440 also made it easier to access the full 768 KB of memory available, to create 12-bit samples from 12.5 to 33.5 seconds and up to 41.667 kHz.

- 15.625 kHz rate : 33.5 seconds — 6 kHz bandwidth
- 31.250 kHz rate : 16.7 seconds — 12 kHz bandwidth
- 41.667 kHz rate : 12.5 seconds — 18 kHz bandwidth

== Sequencer ==
- 8 tracks
- 40,000 note capacity
- 999 measures per sequence
- 99 sequences
- Two discrete MIDI outs with up to 32 channels of MIDI

== Notable users ==
- Aphex Twin
- The Beatmasters
- Dan the Automator
- Simon Harris
- King Tech
- Mantronix
- Rod Modell
- The Orb
- Prince Paul
- Three Times Dope
