= Sonic Core =

Sonic Core is a German developer of digital audio systems, that in 2007 took over some of the assets of Creamware, and continues to support, manufacture and develop the Scope DSP hardware platform and associated software that was originally developed by that company.

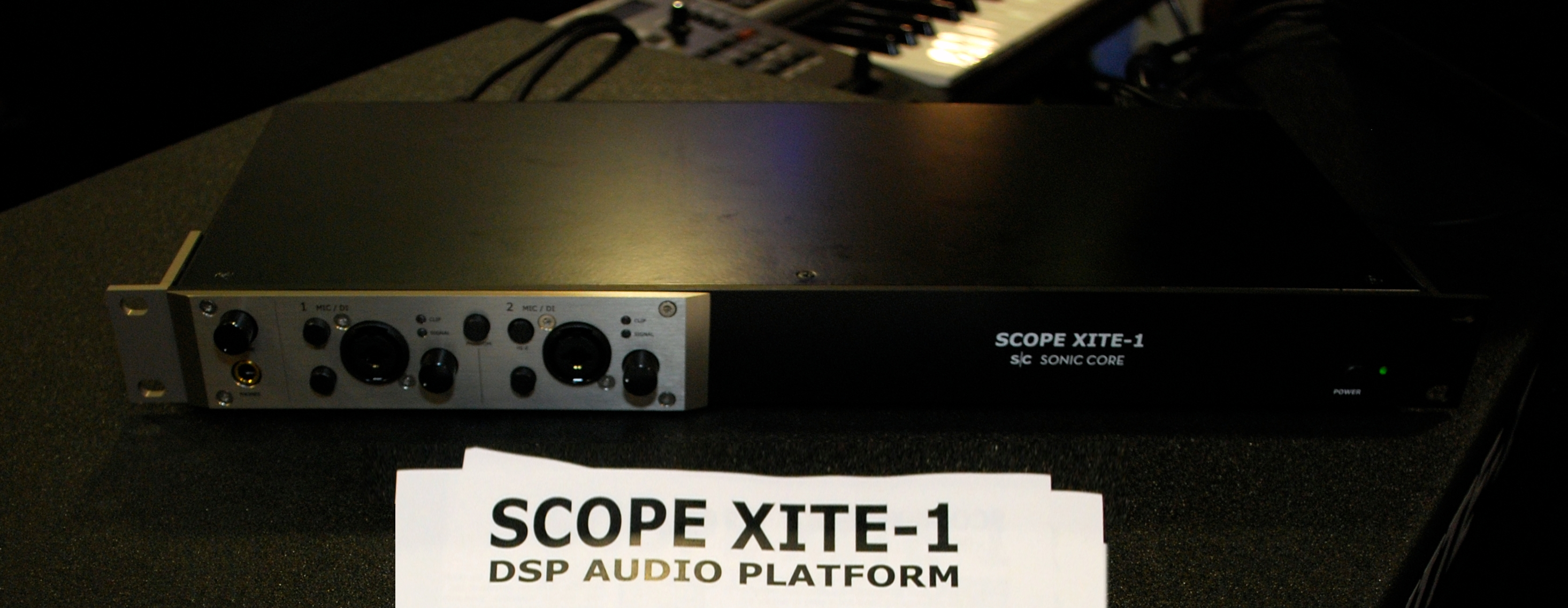
Scope Xite-1 (2009) DSP Audio Platform

The company released the Scope Xite-1 in 2009, but unlike older Scope products developed by Creamware that were internal PCI cards the Xite is an external rack unit, combining a high-end audio interface with a powerful DSP-based audio accelerator farm based on newer DSP chips than the older Scope platform used, but compatibility with older software is maintained by also providing a farm of 6 processors from the original cards. Interfacing with a host computer is done using a PCIe card or an ExpressCard. The company has also released pay-for updates to the Scope software platform, thus enabling owners of older Creamware cards to use software written for newer products and run the cards under newer versions of Microsoft Windows.

Updates for other products that were originally developed as additional Scope components by Creamware have also started to show up, version 4 of the Modular Synthesiser was made available in December 2009 as a paid upgrade but the company has also been helping third parties that have written software for the Scope platform to release their software as hardware products, the Solaris that is manufactured by John Bowen is the result of such a collaboration.
