= Creamware (company) =

Manufacturer of sound cards and synthesizers

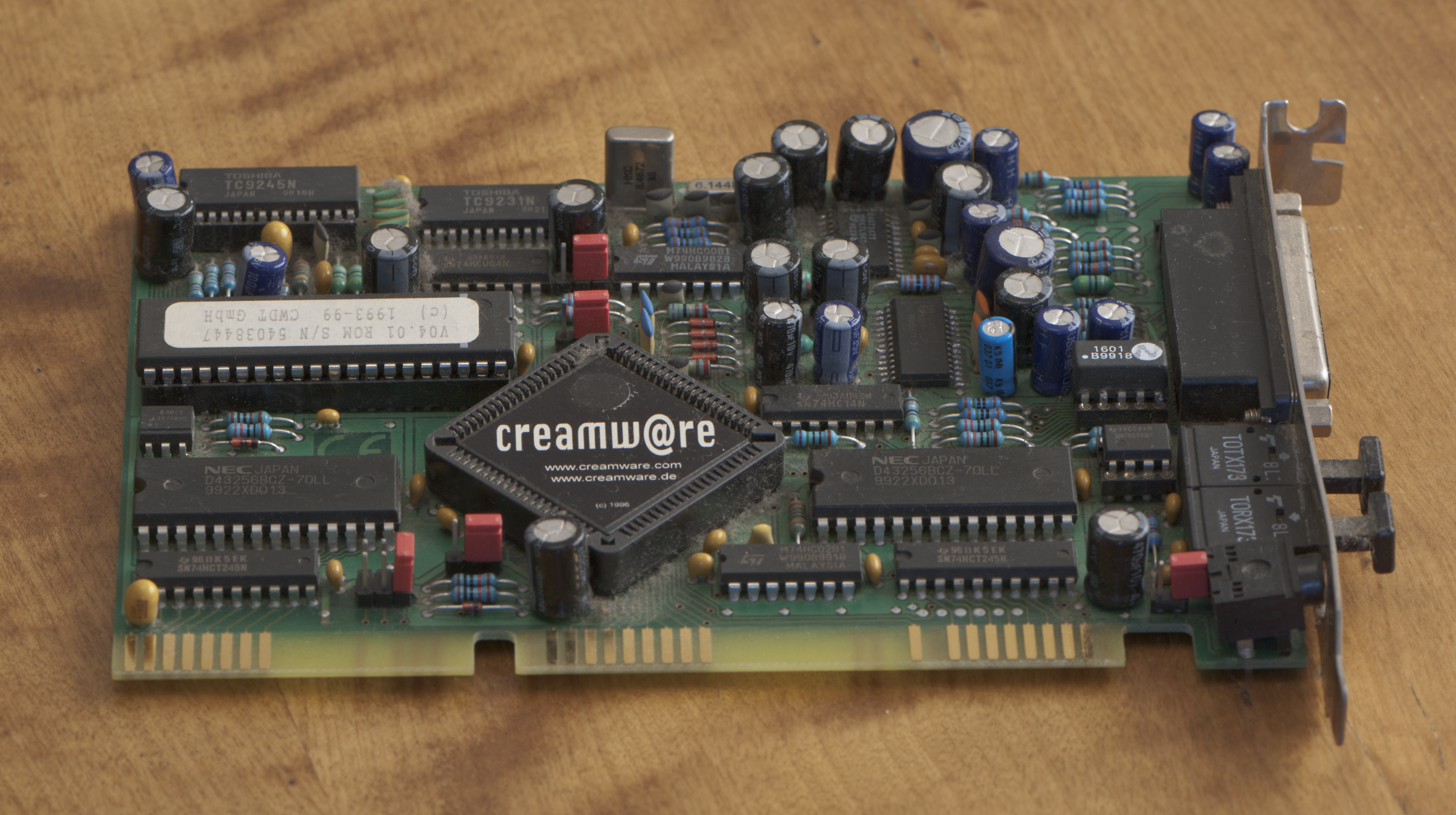
Creamware CutMaster Pro DSP-based sound card for sound synthesis

Creamware Audio GmbH (typically styled as creamw@re) was a manufacturer of DSP-based sound cards and synthesizers in Siegburg, Germany. These cards are used to create synthesized sounds for audio production in music and other audio environments. The company was founded in 1992 and operated until 2006. In 2007, the company 'Sonic Core' purchased certain Creamware assets and intellectual property.

Creamware also developed several digital audio software/hardware combination systems that became popular with radio broadcasters throughout the late 1990s. These systems included 'TripleDAT' and a scaled-down version called 'CutMaster'. Both versions were widely used by German and Canadian commercial radio stations, and state owned Chinese radio stations. About 200 systems were also shipped to Australia, where they were used by government, commercial and public access/community stations. Stations used the software for the production of commercial/sponsorship advertising, audio (radio) documentary, and occasionally, for the production of actual full-length produced (pre-recorded) radio shows.

== History ==
The hardware Creamware created was among the first linearly scalable DSP systems, with expansion DSP boards being offered to increase the processing power of the platform. As a real time DSP platform, there was no processing (waiting) time for changes to take effect.

The software made by Creamware offered better visual handling of audio 'samples', sometimes called 'clips' or 'items' in similar software. A user could easily drag samples up and down virtual digital multi-tracks in a window called the 'arranger'. Zooming functions allowed users to zoom-in on fine wave form detail, then easily return to a position where the user could gain a complete overview of their work.

=== Acquisition by Sonic Core ===
After several long periods of financial trouble, the company was finally taken over and reorganized by Sonic Core. Sonic Core have acquired all Creamware hardware technology and a former Creamware engineer acquired the software code (for products such as TripleDAT), establishing a new development company in India.

== Products ==
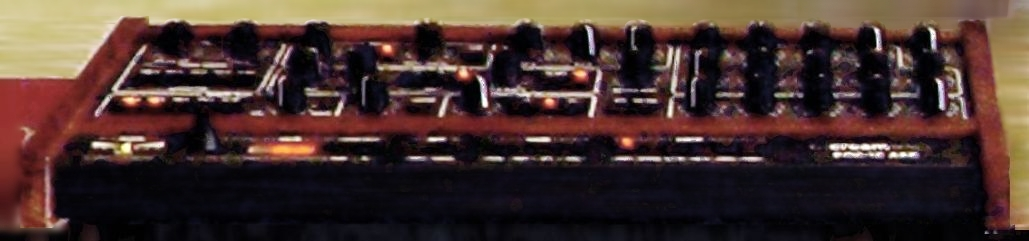
Pro-12 ASB virtual analog synthesizer module

- Elektra
- Minimax ASB
- B4000 ASB
- Noah
- PowerSampler
- Pro-12 ASB
- Prodyssey ASB
- Pulsar
- Pulsar II
- TripleDAT / CutMaster / EasyCut (Variations of the standard Creamware Digital Audio Workstation environment)

=== Modular ===
Modular III was a modular synthesizer running on DSPs (digital signal processors, a type of computer chip designed for signal processing), as part of the software environment provided for the Creamware 'Scope' line of sound cards. It had modules covering many aspects of sound synthesis, designed by Creamware Audio GmbH and by other designers. The software can be run on a PC (Windows or Mac) (before Mac OS X) using a Creamware Scope Soundcard.

The Creamware Modular Synthesizer has gone through a number of revisions, each adding more modules and greater functionality. The first version was more or less a 'pure' recreation of a traditional hardware modular synth. The later revisions (versions 2 and 3) took greater advantage of the fact that a software implementation can have elements not available to in hardware, such as the ability to provide bespoke user interfaces, and also added a number of new modules with each release. Several third-party developers also created modules for Version 2 and 3 of the software, and hundreds of modules total are available.

Sonic Core currently offer the product as Scope Modular IV.

== See also ==
- Stockert Radio Telescope
