= Linear arithmetic synthesis =

Method of sound synthesis

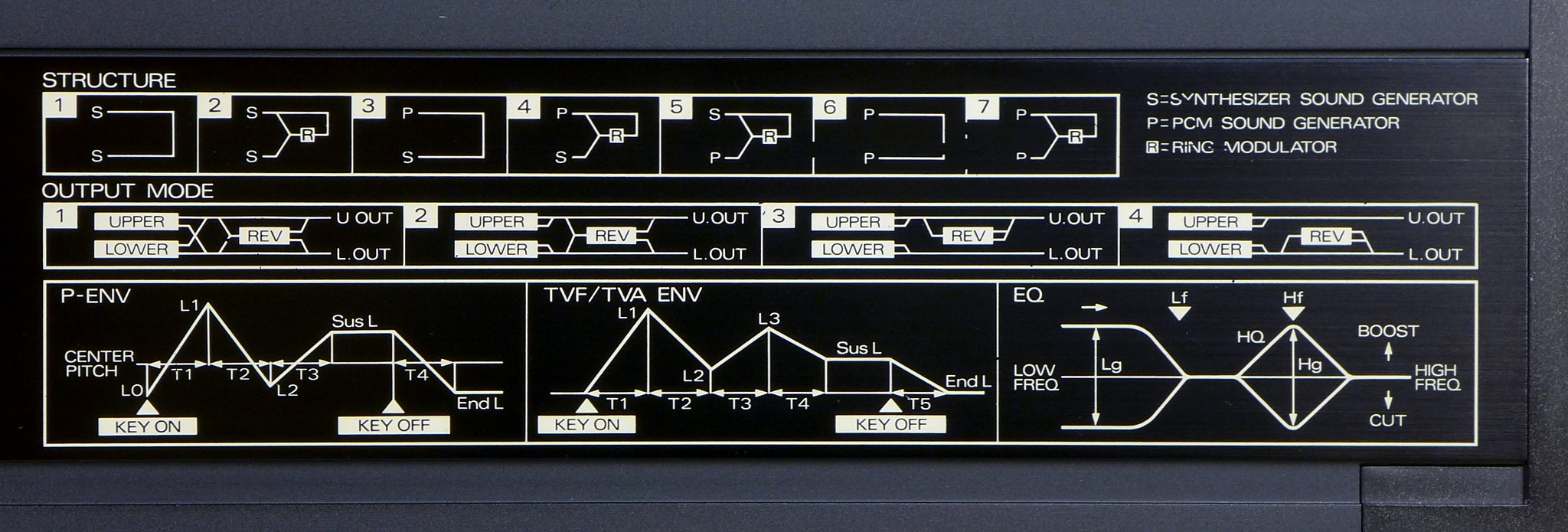
Sound structure of the D-50 (P=PCM and S=synthesizer sound generators)

Linear arithmetic synthesis, or LA synthesis, is a means of sound synthesis invented by the Roland Corporation when they released their D-50 synthesizer in March 1987. It is a hybrid oscillator technique that creates a complex waveform by using a sample for the attack portion of a sound's envelope followed by a smooth transition to a simpler digital oscillator waveform. LA synthesis combines conventional subtractive synthesis with PCM-based samples. It was invented by Ikutaro Kakehashi, President of Roland. It is implemented by a single IC chip inside a synthesizer. An example of this is the LA32 chip used in the Roland MT-32 and other LA synthesizers.

== Overview ==
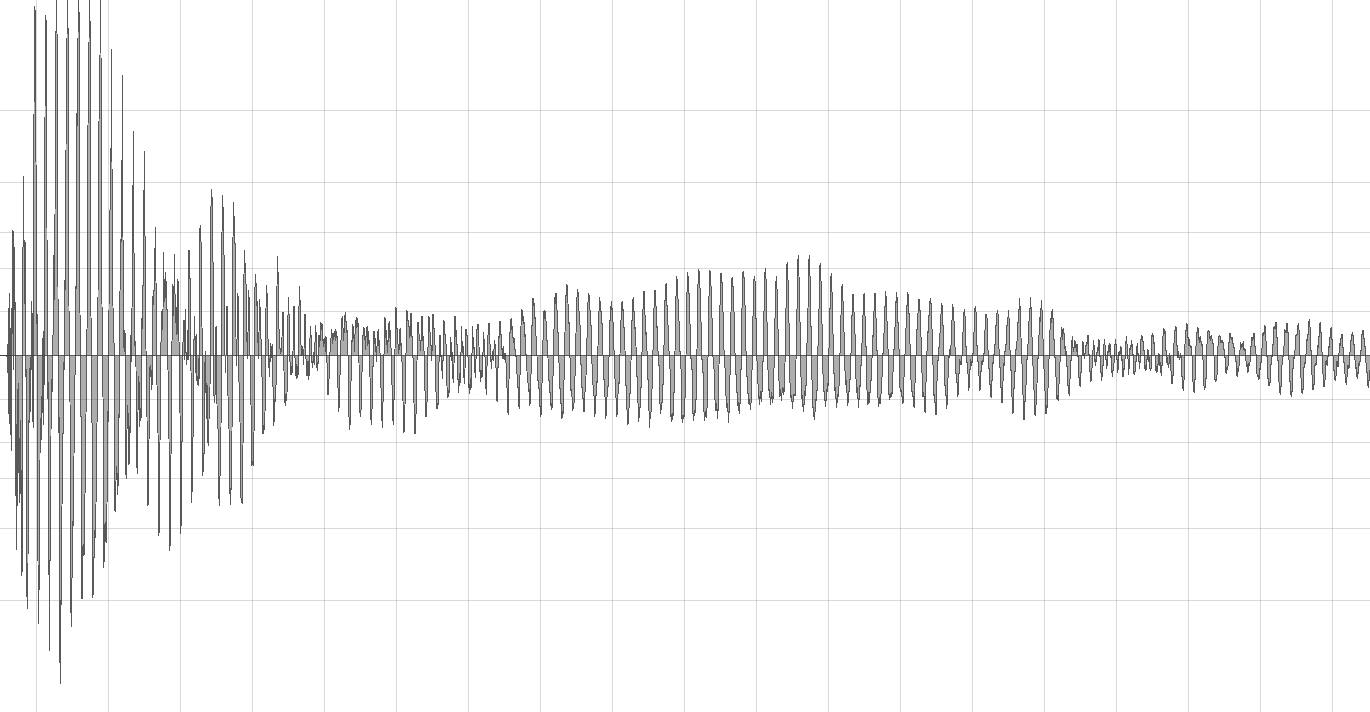
An oscillograph of the Roland D-50 factory patch #44 - “Pizzagogo”

An example using the “Pizzagogo” sound

The term linear arithmetic refers to synthesis that puts sounds together in a timeline. Typically a PCM transient begins a note, which is then continued with a subtractive synthesis prolongation. Roland did not use the term additive, as additive synthesis already refers to a different synthesis method.

This technology first appeared in 1987, in the Roland D-50 synthesizer. At the time, re-synthesizing samplers were very expensive, so Roland set out to produce a machine that would be easy to program, sound realistic, and still sound like a synthesizer. Also, Yamaha had previously gained world market lead with their DX7 FM synth, which excelled at metallic, percussive sounds—something that Roland's synths using subtractive synthesis were less good at.

Roland understood that their subtractive synthesis method had to change. One of the more complex parts of a sound to program is the attack transient, so Roland added a suite of sampled attack transients to subtractive synthesis. As well as the attack transients, Roland added a suite of single-cycle sampled waveforms that could be continuously looped. Sounds could now have three components: An attack, a body made from a subtractive synth sound (saw or pulse wave through a filter) and an "embellishment" of one of many looped samples. (The looped samples also contained a collection of totally synthetic waves derived from additive synthesis, as well as sequences of inharmonic wave cycles. Thus, LA synthesis offered the realistic sounds of a sampler with the control and creativity of a synthesizer.)

The PCM waveforms could be modified with a pitch envelope and a time-variant amplifier. Waveforms from the sound wave generators could be further modified with time-variant filters for cutoff frequency and resonance. These modified waveforms were called "partials".

Two partials grouped together created a tone. Tones could be modified using up to three low-frequency oscillators, a pitch envelope, a programmable equalizer, and on-board effects such as reverberation and chorus. Two tones grouped together created a patch.

== Hardware implementations ==
- Roland CM-32L
- Roland CM-32LN
- Roland CM-64
- Roland CM-500
- Roland D-05
- Roland D-5
- Roland D-10
- Roland D-110
- Roland D-20
- Roland D-50
- Roland D-550
- Roland D-70
- Roland E-10
- Roland E-15
- Roland E-20
- Roland E-30
- Roland Pro-E
- Roland GR-50
- Roland JD-800
- Roland LAPC-I
- Roland LAPC-N
- Roland MT-32
- Roland MT-100
- Roland RA-50
- Roland VariOS (VC-1 card)

== Gallery ==
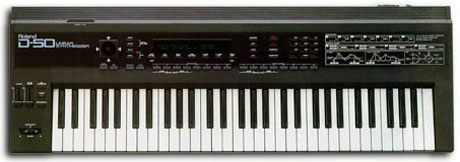
Roland D-50 keyboard synthesizer

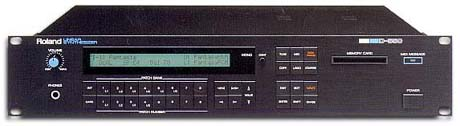
Roland D-550 rack mounted version of the D-50

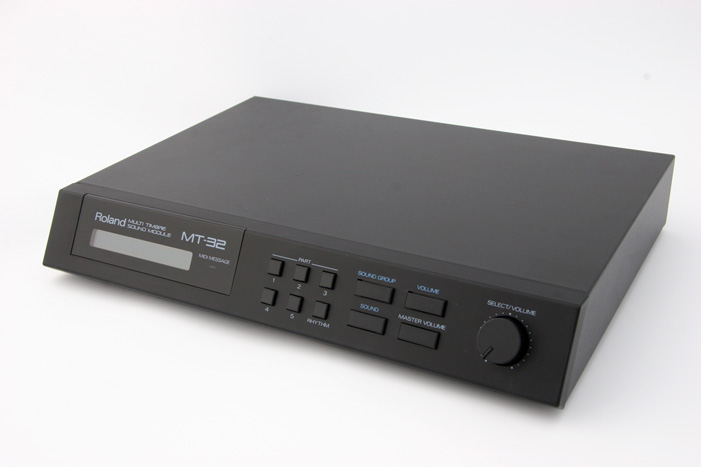
Roland MT-32 sound module

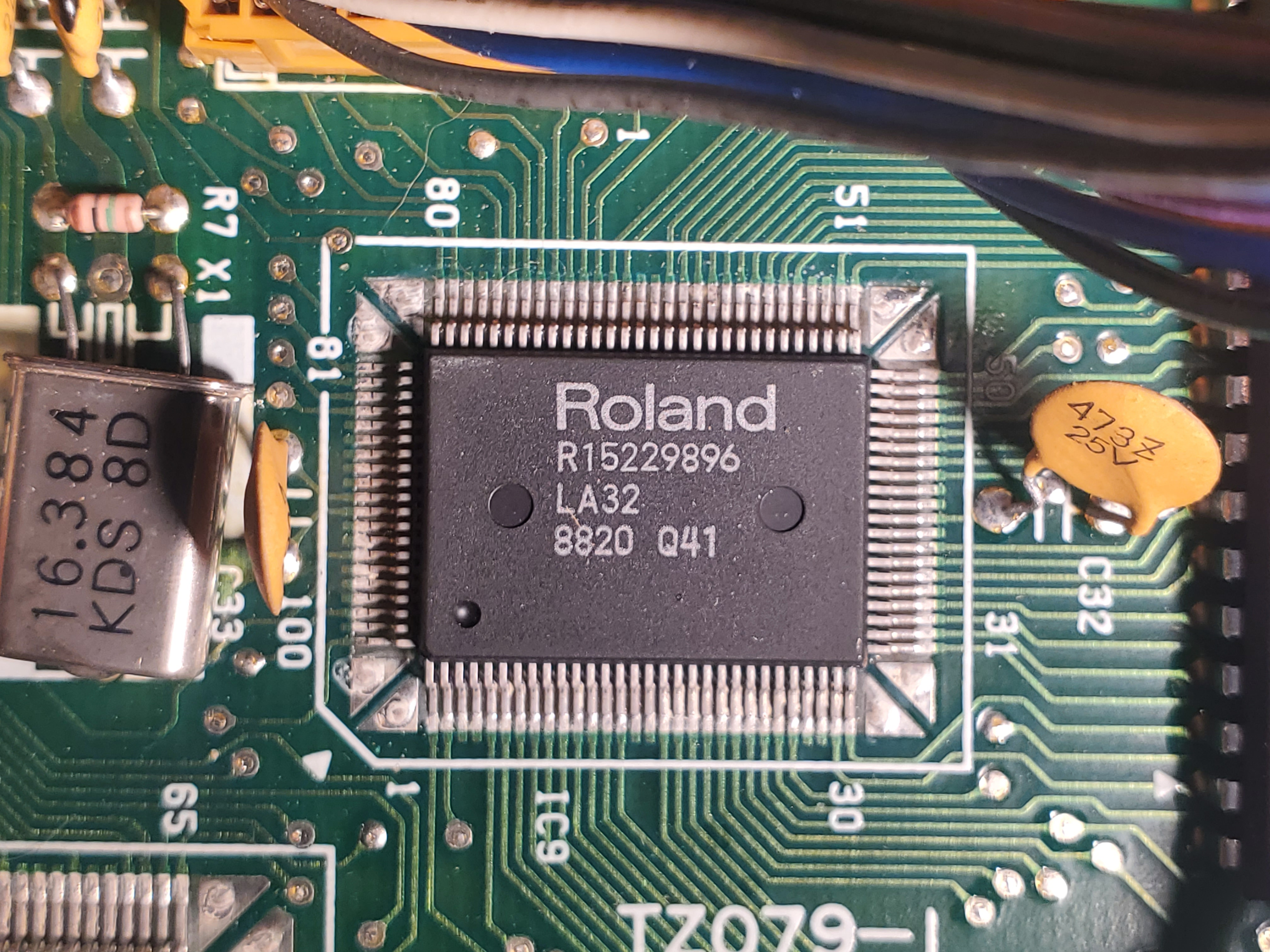
Roland LA32 chip on a D-110 circuit board
