= Roland D-50 =

Synthesizer

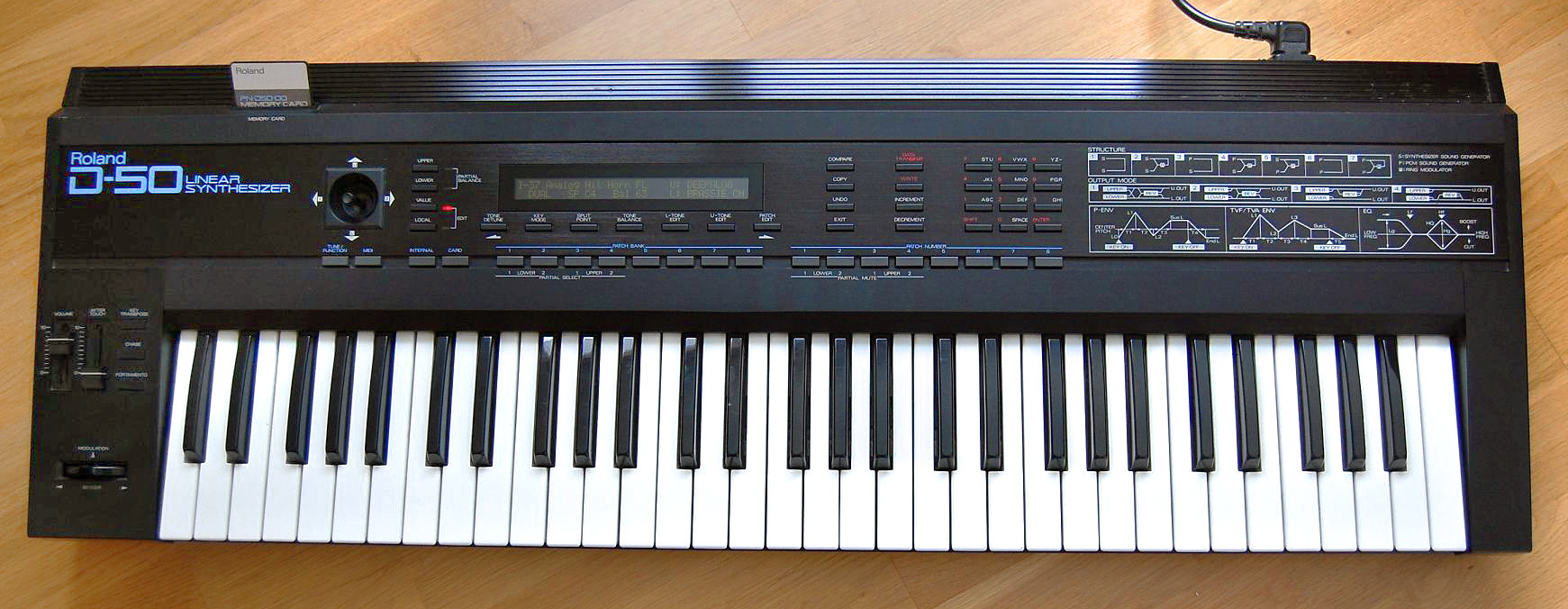
- Manufacturer: Roland Corporation
- Dates: 1987–1991
- Price: $1,895 - 2,095 US £1,445 GBP (Later £1,350) ¥238,000 JPY

Technical specifications
- Polyphony: 16 voices, 8 voices (Dual or Split mode)
- Timbrality: 2-part (2 Partials per part)
- Oscillator: 32 partials with 2 per voice; 4 per voice in Dual or Split mode
- LFO: 3 per voice
- Synthesis type: Digital Sample-based Subtractive (Linear Arithmetic)
- Filter: Low-pass resonant filter Time Variant Filter (TVF) for square wave (non-PCM) Partials
- Attenuator: ADSR envelope referred to as Time Variant Amplifier (TVA)
- Aftertouch expression: Yes
- Velocity expression: Yes
- Storage memory: 64 patches
- Effects: reverb, chorus, EQ

Input/output
- Keyboard: 61 keys
- Left-hand control: Pitchbend / modulation lever
- External control: MIDI in/out, pedal switch, pedal hold, EXT Control, EXT Pedal

The Roland D-50 is a synthesizer produced by Roland and released in 1987. Its features include linear arithmetic synthesis, on-board effects, a joystick for data manipulation, and an analog synthesis-styled layout design. The external Roland PG-1000 (1987) programmer could also be attached to the D-50 for more complex manipulation of its sounds. It was also produced in a rack-mount variant design, the D-550, with almost 450 user-adjustable parameters.

The D-50 has been used by musicians including Prince, Sting, Michael Jackson, Enya, OMD and Miles Davis.

== History ==
The D-50 was the first affordable synthesizer to combine sample playback with subtractive synthesis. The engineers at Roland determined that the most difficult component of an instrument's sound to simulate realistically is the attack. To better emulate realistic sounds, the D-50 included 47 attack samples in ROM. The synthesizer played back an attack sample which was dove-tailed with more conventional subtractive synthesis to create the sustain of the sound. This dual-use method was required in 1987 since RAM was so expensive. Roland did, however, incorporate a number of texture samples that could be mixed into the synthesized sustain part of a patch. These sustain samples gave many D-50 patches a lush and airy quality.

The Roland D-50 was awarded a TEC Award for outstanding technical achievement in musical technology in 1988.

== Technology ==
Although the D-50 was among the first non-sampling machines to be able to produce sounds with sample-based characteristics, it was not long before many synthesizers on the market began using similar methods to create sounds. Roland later released a series of lower-priced keyboards and modules that allowed musicians who could not afford the relatively expensive flagship D-50 to have some of these sounds (Roland D-10 (1988), D-110 (rack version of D-10) (1988), D-20 (1988), D-5 (1989), MT-32). Though these lower-priced D-series synthesizers did not contain the full LA synth engine, each was 8-part multi-timbral, and Roland doubled the number of onboard PCM samples. Roland also produced the 76-key, 6-octave Super-LA D-70 (1989-1990). With the D-70 Roland removed the digital synthesis section, which was replaced with full-length, more realistic and natural-sounding samples, including an acoustic piano, which the D-50 lacked. The D-70 also had an expanded filter and effects section and was 5 part multi-timbral. Even with its improvements, however, the D-70 was unable to catch up with the dominant workstation of the time—the Korg M1—and failed to become the next Roland flagship synthesizer.

The D-50 produces a hybrid analog/digital sound: one can use traditional square and saw waveforms together with PCM samples of actual acoustic instrument attack transient, modified by LFOs, TVFs, TVAs, ring modulator, effects, etc. This breakthrough led to the creation of totally new sounds never done before on either purely analog synths or digital samplers.

Each D-50 sound (patch) was made up of 2 tones (upper and lower) and each tone was made up of 2 partials. Each partial could be either a synthesizer waveform (a square with variable pulse, or after manipulation by the filter, a sawtooth) and a filter or a digital PCM waveform (sampled attack transient or looped sustain waveform). The partials could be arranged following 1 of 7 possible structures (algorithms), with a combination of either a PCM waveform or synthesized waveform, with an option to ring-modulate the two partials together. The synthesized waveforms could be pulse-width modulated and passed through a digital mathematical approximation of a low-pass filter, allowing for subtractive synthesis. The lower and upper parts could be split or played in dual on the keyboard. The Dual configuration allows two 8-voice polyphony Tones (two Partials each) to be played from separate MIDI channels as a limited bi-timbral mode (no full Patches with both Upper and Lower Tones available).

Not only was the synthesis method new; the D-50 was among the first commercial synthesizers to include digital effects (reverb, chorus, delay, etc.). Each of those effects had 10+ variations with editable parameters usually found in dedicated rack effects processors rather than keyboard synths of the era. It was also at the forefront of the change of the look of a typical keyboard player on stage: instead of being surrounded with multiple instruments, with more versatile instruments and the continued adoption of the MIDI standard, they were starting to appear with only one or two keyboards, typically a D-50 with either the Yamaha DX7 or the Korg M1, sometimes all three synths.

The D-50 was fully MIDI-compatible, though it transmits on only one channel. The keyboard was velocity- and after-touch-sensitive, and the keys were slightly "weighted" with metal for a higher-quality feel. It included 64 patches on board, and storage of 64 more patches was available through optional expansion RAM cards. It uses a CR2032 lithium battery for memory backup.

For its sound and build quality, and the unique synthesis method it featured, the D-50 has remained popular to this day, with the resale value of good condition examples remaining relatively high. Its synthesis engine, in more or less updated forms, was used in Roland's JV and XP series synths, among others. Furthermore, in 2004, Roland released a VC-1 expansion card for V-Synth and VariOS synthesizers. It contained a modeled and updated D-50 synthesis engine and the original operating system, including factory- and all Roland expansion cards patches. Since the newer DAC chips sounded cleaner with less noise output and overall higher bit depth and sample rates, it included the option to simulate the D-50's rougher output.

The D-550 is a rack-mount version of the D-50, with fewer front panel controls, no joystick and sliders. It employs the same sound circuitry (the main circuit board is exactly the same in both, labeled D-50/D-550).

The D-50's capabilities could be modified through the addition of third-party products by Musitronics, most notably the M-EX which made the D-50 multitimbral (the D-50 was bi-timbral) and expanded the patch memory, as well as a chip that improved the D-50's response to incoming MIDI commands.

== Legacy ==
The D-50 was introduced in 1987 as the popularity of the Yamaha DX7 was starting to decline, resulting in the D-50 becoming the most popular synthesizer on the market until the introduction of the Korg M1 the following year. The D-50's synthesizer-on-top-of-samples-and-through-effects innovation was an influence on the M1, which went on to become Korg's top-selling keyboard, until the release of the Korg Triton in 1999. In fact, this scheme was a common method of digital keyboard sound creation for more than a decade, until ROM and Flash RAM were finally inexpensive enough to store entire samples or multisamples.

The presets of the D-50, authored by Eric Persing and Adrian Scott, were well received by the artists' community, and most of them can be heard on numerous commercial albums of the late 1980s. The D-50's factory presets have enjoyed a long legacy, such as "Digital Native Dance", "Staccato Heaven", "Fantasia", "Pizzagogo", "Glass Voices", and "Living Calliope". Some other D-50 presets live on in every machine that conforms to the General MIDI specification, including "Fantasia" (alternatively called "New Age Pad"), "Soundtrack", "Atmosphere", and "Nylon Atmosphere".

The "Pizzagogo" preset has a lively plucking strings impression. Enya's song "Orinoco Flow" famously featured "Pizzagogo" with emphasised attack.

The Roland V-Synth and V-Synth XT can load a card that emulates the D-50. In this mode, they copy the D-50 almost perfectly, although they lose the more sophisticated V-Synth capabilities.

On September 8, 2017, Roland announced the Roland D-05, a miniaturized version of the D-50, as part of their Boutique series. The instrument includes the original presets of the D-50, plus all of the ROM expansions Roland created for it. The instrument was released in October 2017.

Also in 2017, Roland released a VST plugin version of the D-50 via their Roland Cloud website.

== See also ==
- Roland D-70
