= Keyboard bass =

Use of a keyboard to substitute for a bass guitar or double bass in music

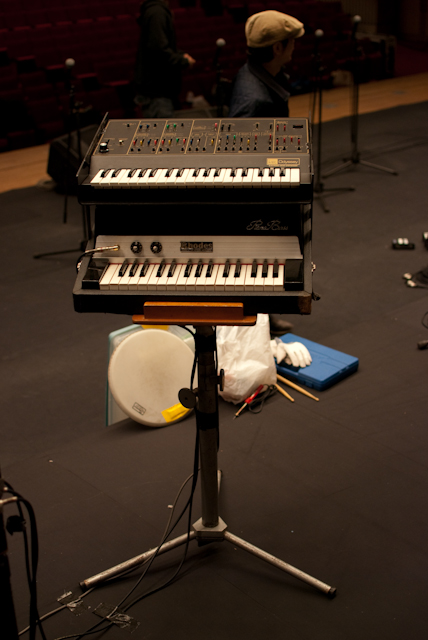
ARP Odyssey and Rhodes Piano Bass

Keyboard bass (shortened to keybass and sometimes referred as a synth bass) is the use of a smaller, low-pitched keyboard with fewer notes than a regular keyboard or pedal keyboard to substitute for the deep notes of a bass guitar or double bass in music.

== History ==
=== Early keyboard bass ===
The pipe organ is the first, and the forefather of keyboard bass instruments. The bass pedal keyboard was developed in the 13th century. The keys for the hands are also capable of playing very low pipe tones.

=== 1960s ===
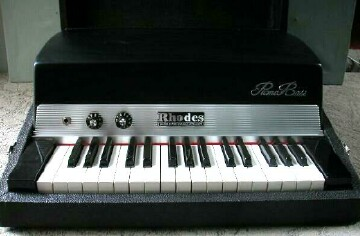
Rhodes Piano Bass (1960)

The earliest keyboard bass instrument was the 1960 Fender Rhodes piano bass, pictured to the right. The piano bass was essentially an electric piano containing the same pitch range as the most widely-used notes on an electric bass (or the double bass), which could be used to perform bass lines. It could be placed on top of a piano or organ, or mounted on a stand.

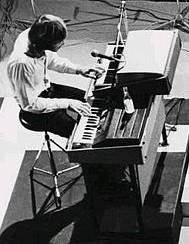
Ray Manzarek of the Doors performing live on Danish television, using his signature technique: a Rhodes Piano Bass with his left hand, while performing the main melodies with his right on an organ.

About the same time, Hohner of Germany introduced a purely electronic bass keyboard, the Basset, which had a two-octave keyboard and rudimentary controls allowing a choice of tuba or string bass sounds. The Basset was in due course replaced by the Bass 2 and, in the mid-1970s, the Bass 3. All three were transistorized; the Basset was among the earliest solid-state electronic instruments. Similar instruments were produced in Japan under the "Raven" and "Rheem Kee Bass" [sic] names.

=== 1970s and 1980s ===
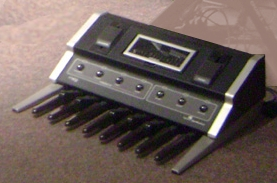
Moog Taurus (1976–1981)

In the 1970s, a variant form of keyboard bass, bass pedals, became popular. Bass pedals are pedal keyboards operated by musicians using their feet. The guitar players or bass players of bands such as Genesis' Mike Rutherford, Yes' Chris Squire, John Paul Jones of Led Zeppelin during acoustic sets, Geddy Lee of Rush, The Police (bassist Sting), or Atomic Rooster (organist Vincent Crane) use the bass pedals to play bass lines. Stevie Wonder pioneered the use of synthesizer keyboard bass, notably on "Boogie on Reggae Woman". Funk, R&B, G Rap and hiphop musicians such as George Clinton & Parliament, Funkadelic, Roger & Zapp, Dr. Dre, E-40, EPMD, and Kashif used synth bass. During these decades the keyboard bass in its original form was still in use by some bands such as the B-52's, who used a Korg SB-100 "Synth-Bass".

In addition to bass guitar, Tina Weymouth of Talking Heads played keyboard bass on some of the band’s material, using a Sequential Circuits Prophet-5 in the studio and a Moog Rogue synthesizer for live performances, including the concert film Stop Making Sense.

=== 1990s-present ===
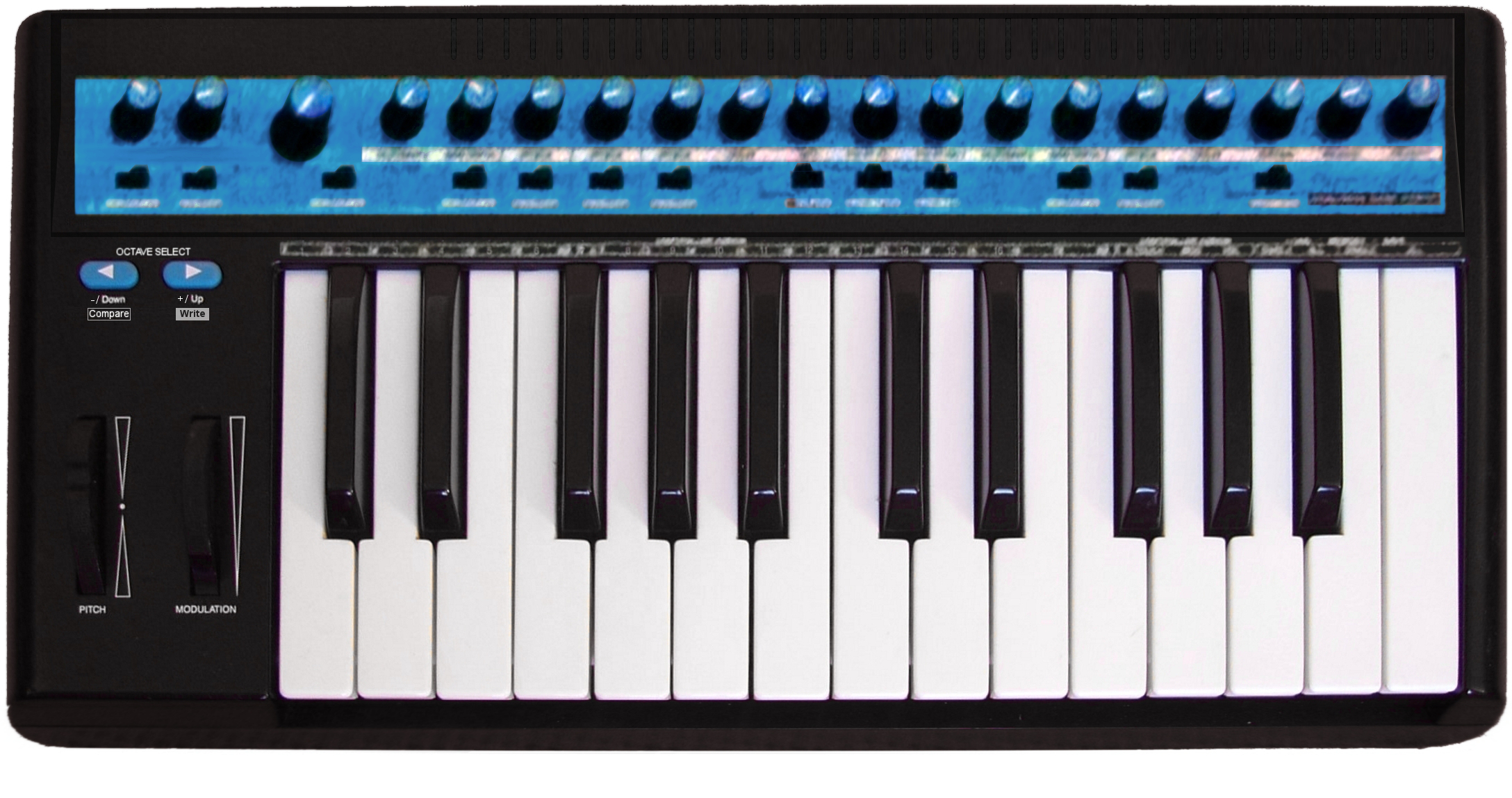
Novation BassStation (1993)

Since the 1990s, MIDI keyboard controllers, often smaller 25-note models, have been used by some groups to play bass lines with virtual instruments such as synthesizers and samplers. Keyboard bass instruments are frequently used in hip hop, contemporary R&B, and pop music, and in electronic dance music genres such as house music. MIDI keyboards are used by bedroom producers and studio musicians alike, thanks to their affordability, portability, and the fact that they can be used to control multiple virtual instruments, rather than simply bass.

Some rock bands without a dedicated bass guitarist have had a keyboardist cover the bass lines on a keyboard bass. Jack White of The White Stripes has used a vintage Fender Rhodes Piano Bass in live performances. During Lady Gaga's The Monster Ball Tour, keyboardist and bassist Lanar "Kern" Brantley played synth bass on the Roland GAIA and Roland V-Synth.

== See also ==
- Bass pedals
- Pedal keyboard
