= Roland D-70 =

1990 synthesizer

- Manufacturer: Roland Corporation
- Dates: 1990
- Price: £1799 GBP

Technical specifications
- Polyphony: 30 Voices
- Timbrality: 6 part (5-parts + 1-percussion)
- Oscillator: 4
- LFO: Yes (Saw Up, Saw Down, Square, Triangle)
- Synthesis type: ROMpler and DLM ("Differential Loop Modulation")
- Filter: TVF FILTER: low-pass-resonant
- Aftertouch expression: Yes
- Velocity expression: Yes
- Storage memory: 10 user sets, 64 performances, 128 patches, 128 tones
- Effects: Reverb, Chorus, Flanger

Input/output
- Keyboard: 76 notes
- Left-hand control: Bender / Modulation Lever, Master Volume Slider, C1 Slider
- External control: MIDI Expression Pedal Jack, Pedal Switch Jack, Hold Pedal Jack

The Roland D-70 is a 76 note Super LA synthesizer produced in Japan in 1990. it featured a 240 × 64 pixel backlit LCD and competed with the likes of the Korg M1 and T-series workstations and Yamaha SY77 workstation, although the D-70 was not itself a workstation because it lacked a sequencer. The D-70 can also split or layer the four tones that constitute a patch and has the same TVF filters used later in the JD-800. It has onboard drums sounds and is 6-part multi timbral (5 synth parts and one drum part). It has four left control faders that can be assigned in real time to the following paramemeters: Level, Pan, Tuning, Cutoff, Resonance, Attack, and Release. It has three modes of play: Mono, Polyphonic, Split. Despite being anticipated as a "Super D-50", it is in fact a different machine, a prototype of what would later become the JD-800 and the very successful JV series full-sample playback synths (ROMplers).

== Expandability ==
The D-70 also can read U220 series PCM cards, and has two PCM card slots on the rear of the unit, and also a RAM slot.

== Typical sounds ==
Typical sounds include: Rhodes, strings, pianos, organ patches and also synth sounds such as: Ghosties, Prologue and SpaceDream.

== Effects ==
There are six reverbs (Room 1–3, Hall 1 & 2 and Gated), delay and cross-delay, and one effect from Chorus 1 & 2, FB-Chorus, Flanger and Short Delay in another effect. There are just three reverb / delay parameters: reverb/delay time and level and delay feedback. Chorus / flanger allows you to set level, delay, rate, depth and feedback.

== See also ==
- Roland D-05
