= Roland SC-55 =

MIDI sound module

- Developer: Roland Corporation
- Type: General MIDI, GS
- Released: March 1991
- Display: Monochrome LCD
- Platform: IBM PC compatible, PC-88, PC-98, X68000
- Predecessor: Roland MT-32
- Successor: Roland SC-88
- Related: Roland SC-8850

The Roland SC-55 (Sound Canvas) is a GS MIDI sound module released in March 1991 by Roland. The SC-55 was the first sound module to incorporate the new General MIDI standard. It was the first in the Roland Sound Canvas series.

Unlike its predecessor, the SC-55 only uses PCM synthesis, supporting up to 24-voice polyphony with 16-part multitimbrality. Aimed at PC music enthusiasts, the SC-55 featured 315 instrument patches, including the GS drum kits and additional controllers. The selection of effects includes reverb and chorus. It additionally came preloaded with patches imitating the Roland MT-32's variation bank but lacked the MT-32's re-programmability.

Alongside the SC-55, Roland released the SB-55 (Sound Brush), an inexpensive MIDI sequencer module the same size as the Sound Canvas. Both the Sound Canvas and Sound Brush could be rackmounted alongside each other.

Other models with comparable tone generators include Roland CM-300, Roland CM-500 and Roland SC-155 sound modules. CM-300 and CM-500 models lack the LCD screen and extended controls of SC-55. Both models have external appearance nearly identical to Roland's earlier CM-32/64-series modules. SC-155 adds additional slider controls for master and channel level and panning. Additionally, CM-500 includes a fully SysEx compatible LA tone generator similar to CM-32Ls.

== The SC-55mkII ==
A minor upgrade to the original SC-55, the Roland SC-55mkII has increased polyphony (28 voices), more patches, raising the total number to 354 instruments and extended, and improved audio-circuitry in the form of 18-bit audio (versus 16-bit in the original SC 55.)

The SC-55mkII added a serial port as an alternative inexpensive computer interface to the MIDI connectors, which required the use of an MPU-401 or similar MIDI controller.

== Roland SCC-1 ==
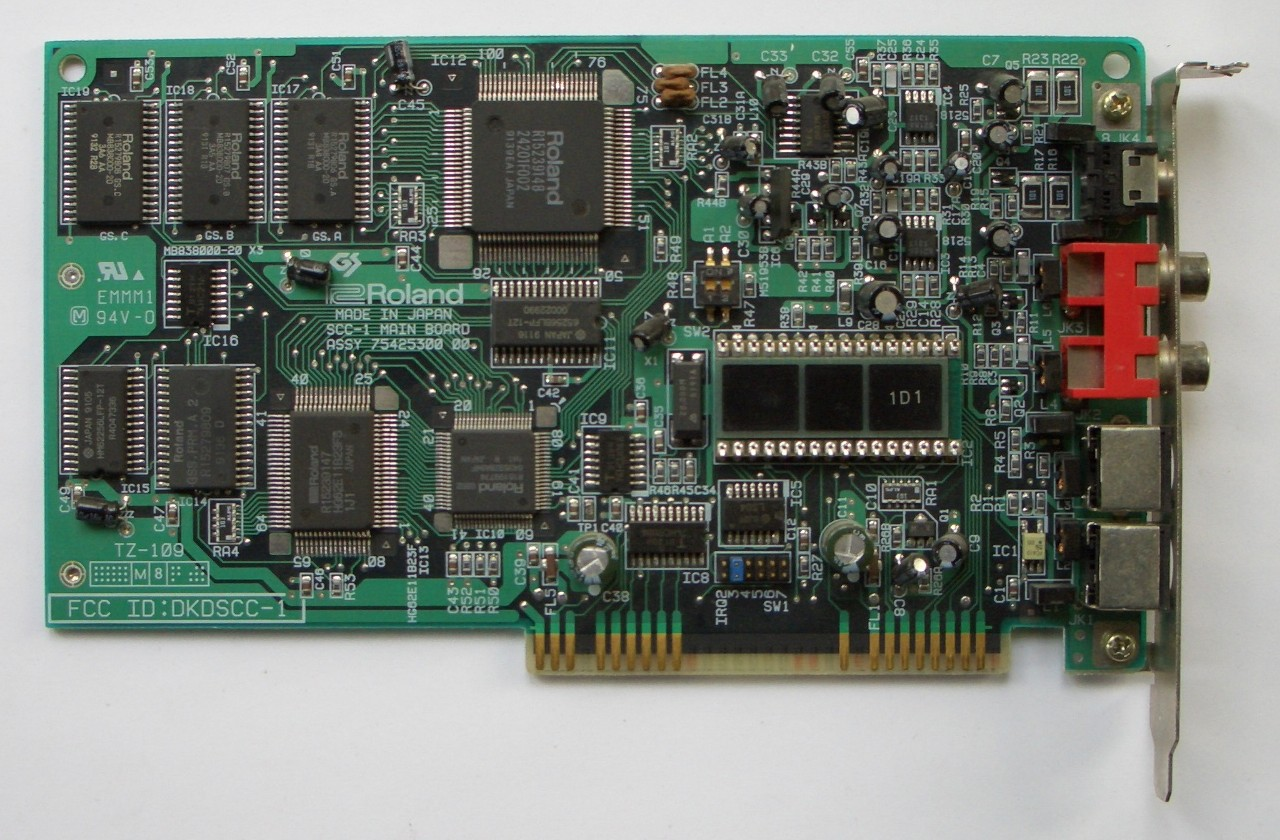
Roland SCC-1

Roland also released the Roland SCC-1, an 8-bit ISA half-size card incarnation of the CM-300 sound module. The sound source is controlled by an on-board MIDI Processing Unit, a variant of the MPU-401 unit. An updated version featuring the SC-55mkII sound set was also released, known as SCC-1A. When bundled with the Band-in-a-Box and BalladeGS software, it is called SCC-1B.

Roland later replaced the SCC-1 with a combination of their MPU-401AT MIDI interface card and SCB-55 Wave Blaster-compatible daughterboard. Roland referred to this combination as the SCM-15AT. The SCC-1 was also sold as the GPPC-N for the NEC PC-98.

== CM-32P and MT-32 emulation ==
Since the SC-55 has no programmable memory, CM-32P and MT-32 emulation is done by providing the same sound arrangement as the preset sounds of actual devices. These variation banks are enabled by playing back special SysEx containing MIDI files, for example, GS32.MID (included in the SCC-1 Utility Software), prior to loading a software title. These specially arranged tone tables contain the relevant GS sound mapped at either CM-32P or MT-32 program number. Pitch bend range is changed to 12 semitones from GS default 2 semitones. Master tuning and modulation depth are not altered by the emulation. Pan directions are reversed from actual CM-32P or MT-32 devices. CM-32P or MT-32 specific MIDI SysEx messages are also ignored by the SC-55.

=== MT-32 emulation samples ===
The Roland SC-55's CM-32P and MT-32 emulation is based on using preset sounds of the actual devices without using programmable memory or actual device synthesis techniques. This results in poor emulation for software relying on custom programmable MT-32 sounds, as demonstrated by the introduction of the Sierra On-Line game Space Quest III: The Pirates of Pestulon.

Emulation for software supporting the Roland MT-32 but not using its memory is better, as demonstrated by the introduction song from Origin Systems' Ultima VI: The False Prophet.

== See also ==
- Roland SC-8850
