= MCB-1 =

The Roland MCB-1 is a module designed for the Roland LAPC-I sound card. The MCB-1 interfaces to the LAPC-I through a proprietary interface with a DB-15 connector.

The MCB-1 has four DIN connectors: 1 MIDI IN, 2 MIDI OUT, a SYNC OUT (possibly MTC) and three mini jack (3.5 mm) connectors: TAPE IN and OUT and a METRONOME OUT.

The MCB-1 was also released for the LAPC-N for NEC computers as the MCB-2.
