= Roland JD-800 =

Digital synthesizer

JD-800
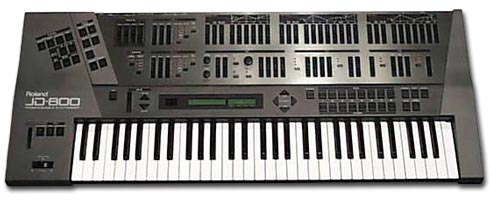
- Manufacturer: Roland
- Dates: 1991–1996
- Price: US$2,895; UK£1,699; JP¥300,000

Technical specifications
- Polyphony: 24 voices using 1 tone 6 voices using 4 tones
- Timbrality: 5 + 1 drum part (61 note assignable)
- Oscillator: 3 MB of PCM ROM with 108 waveforms + 1 MB expansion, 4 waveforms (tones) per patch
- LFO: 2
- Synthesis type: Digital Sample-based Subtractive
- Filter: Resonant multi-mode (lowpass, bandpass & highpass) referred to as TVF (Time Variant Filter)
- Attenuator: 3 multi-stage envelopes
- Aftertouch expression: Yes
- Velocity expression: Yes
- Storage memory: 64 patches, 256 KB RAM card
- Effects: Chorus, delay, distortion, EQ, phaser, spectrum, reverb, enhancer

Input/output
- Keyboard: 61 Keys
- Left-hand control: Pitch, modulation
- External control: MIDI

The Roland JD-800 is a digital synthesizer that was manufactured between 1991 and 1996. It features many knobs and sliders for patch editing and performance control — features that some manufacturers, including Roland, had been omitting in the name of streamlining since the inception of the Yamaha DX7. The JD-800 thus became very popular with musicians who wished to take a hands-on approach to patch programming. The introduction in the manual states that Roland's intention with the JD-800 was to "return to the roots of synthesis". After the discontinuation of the D-50, the JD-800 became the next Roland flagship synthesizer.

== Technology ==
The JD-800 employs sample-based oscillators and a fully digital signal path. This is different than linear arithmetic synthesis (introduced and made famous by the Roland D-50), which combines sample playback with digital synthesis. The JD-800 has 108 built-in sampled waveforms, which can be expanded via PCM cards. The waveforms span a variety of categories such as analog synthesizers, acoustic instruments, and voices. Many of these waveforms are very short and are used primarily for the attack portion of a sound, while longer ones are used for the sustained part of a sound. The JD-800 was Roland's first instrument to have its core presets developed entirely in the United States, under a short-lived branch of its R&D-LA office in Culver City, California. The core sampled waveforms and factory presets of the JD-800 were created by Eric Persing.

A patch, or single sound, in the JD-800 consists of up to four tones. As every tone consists of an almost completely independent synthesizer voice, a patch could be considered a combination of up to four different synthesizers. In Single mode the JD-800 plays one patch at a time, but in Multi mode it is possible to play five different patches over MIDI, plus a "special" patch. The special patch has different waveforms assigned to the 61 different keys on the keyboard, so is used for drums and percussion sounds. The JD-800 has one effects section. In Single mode, seven effects can be used simultaneously, in series, so all tones in a patch go through the same effects. In Multi mode, three effects can be used at the same time, with all patches sharing the same effects, though any of the patches can be routed to bypass the effects.

== Editing and playing ==
Using the Layer buttons, the four tones of a patch can be switched on and off while playing. When in Edit mode, the Layer buttons are used to choose which tone can be edited using the sliders on the front panel. The Palette sliders allow the player to edit the last active parameter of all four tones individually at the same time. While playing, the Palette sliders can be used like a mixer to set the balance between the four tones in a patch. However, due to the limited accuracy of the sliders, and because edited parameters jump from the value in memory to the value corresponding to the position of the slider, moving the sliders while playing tends to cause sudden jumps in the sound.

The JD-800 manual states: "[T]he original purpose of the synthesizer was to 'create sound'. It's easy to simply select a preset you like, but that sound will always be 'someone else's sound'. We at Roland asked, 'Why don't we return to the roots of synthesis; the enjoyment of creating original sounds?' … 'Creating sounds' may seem like a highly technical process, but it's actually just a matter of moving a slider to make the sound change! This is easy for anyone, and the sounds that you get will always be your very own."

== JD-990 ==
Roland released the JD-990 Super JD in 1993. This is an enhanced, rackmount sound module version of the JD-800 with a larger display, and the ability to expand the device with PCM cards for extra sounds.

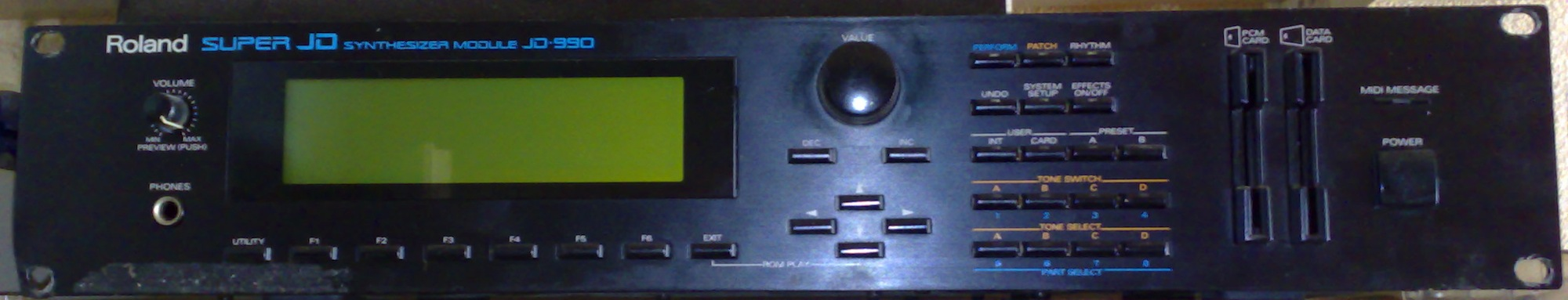
Roland JD-990 rack

== Expandability ==
The JD-800 was expandable by the inclusion of slots for PCM cards (for additional wavesforms), and RAM cards (for additional patches). Roland produced a number of expansion kits consisting of a pair of cards — a PCM card containing new samples, and a RAM card containing a bank of new presets.

=== PCM add-on cards ===
Roland later released eight add-on cards for the JD 800:

1. SL-JD80-01 Drums & Percussion STANDARD
2. SL-JD80-02 Drums & Percussion DANCE
3. SL-JD80-03 Rock Drums
4. SL-JD80-04 Strings Ensemble
5. SL-JD80-05 Brass Section
6. SL-JD80-06 Grand Piano
7. SL-JD80-07 Guitar Collection
8. SL-JD80-08 Accordion

== Notable users ==
- 1 Giant Leap
- A Guy Called Gerald
- Armin van Buuren
- Coldcut
- Faithless
- Future Bible Heroes
- Gary Barlow
- Hidehiko Hoshino
- Jean-Michel Jarre
- Jesus Jones
- Kevin Moore (ex-Dream Theater)
- Vincent Herbert
- Labrinth
- Laurent Garnier
- Mouse on Mars
- Orchestral Manoeuvres in the Dark
- Rick Wakeman
- Tetsu Inoue
- Tom Lord-Alge
- Tony Banks
- Paul Shaffer
- Tom Holkenborg
- Brad Buxer
- Don Boyette
- Pet Shop Boys
- Prodigy
