= Roland VariOS =

VariOS
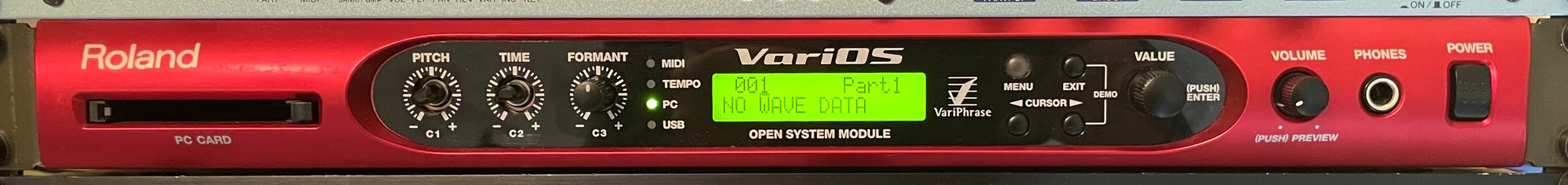
- Manufacturer: Roland
- Dates: 2003

Technical specifications
- Polyphony: 14 voices
- Timbrality: 6 part
- Synthesis type: Open-Ended System Module
- Aftertouch expression: Yes
- Velocity expression: Yes

Input/output
- External control: MIDI / USB

The Roland VariOS is a production environment with audio editing and sample playback, released by Roland Corporation in 2003. It is based on the technology from the VP-9000 VariPhrase processor, and features the ability to mount two expansion cards.

== Overview ==
The Roland VariOS is a rack-mounted open-ended variable system module. It is possible to independently manipulate the pitch, time and formant of a sample, add effects and build complete audio-based arrangements—all in a real-time environment and without CPU drain. In addition, the VariOS can emulate two analog synthesisers: the Roland Jupiter 8 (referred to as VariOS-8) and Roland TB-303. While it's possible Roland intended more software synthesizers for the VariOS none were ever created for it apart from those two.

The VariOS can operate as a stand-alone tool or alongside digital audio sequencers using MIDI clock and MTC sync. V-Producer arrangements can be saved as a Standard MIDI File, and processed audio files can be exported in WAV or AIFF format for use in other editors and software.

The VariOS will attempt to boot from the PCMCIA card first (if VC-1 or VC-2 are installed), otherwise its internal VariOS program will load to be used in conjunction with V-Producer. You must manually engage the software synthesizer programs from the menu by holding down the menu and left arrow button and powering on the unit. The unit will have to be powered on and off multiple times to change each mode as there's no way to change it live in software.

== Expansion cards ==
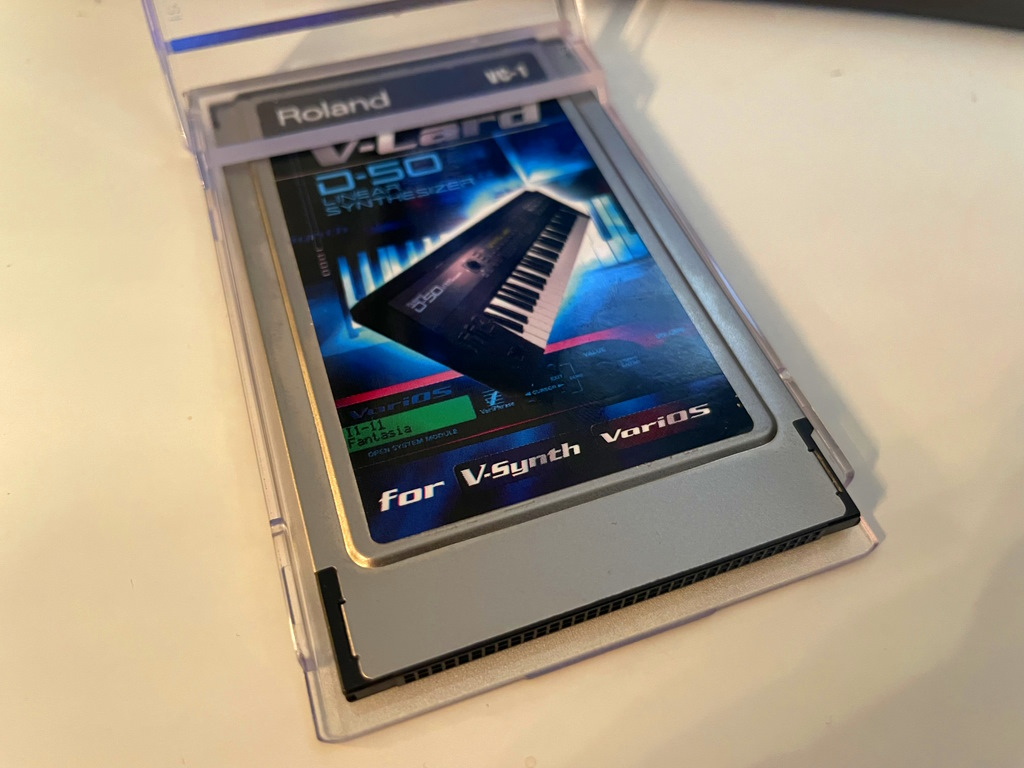
Roland VC-1 PCMCIA Card

Two expansion cards were released for the VariOS and V-Synth lineup. The VC-1 virtualizes a Roland D-50, while the VC-2 can allow vocal processing with an external microphone, with effects such as a vocoder and choir. Roland has not announced plans to release any future expansion cards. Furthermore, it appears the VC-2 is now out of production, with various sources claiming that Roland made a set number of cards in an "estimation" of demand. The Roland VC-1 has two operating modes capable of enhancing the quality of the PCM playback, and the other with the more degraded 'classic' mode. It does not appear Roland has offered this feature on the D-50 Roland Cloud plugin.
