= Roland LAPC-I =

PC sound card

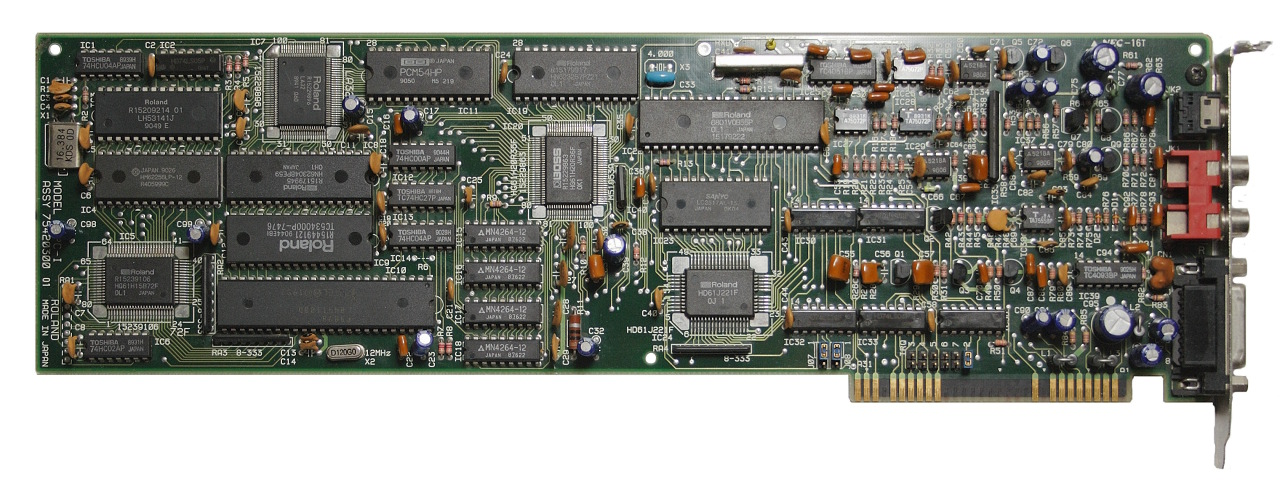
- A Roland LAPC-I ISA card
- Manufacturer: Roland Corporation
- Introduced: 1989; 36 years ago
- Type: sound card

The Roland LAPC-I is a sound card for IBM PC compatible computers produced by Roland Corporation. It essentially consists of a MT-32-compatible Roland CM-32L and a MPU-401 unit, integrated onto a single full-length 8-bit ISA card. In addition to normal Roland dealers aimed at musicians, it was distributed in the United States by Sierra On-Line in 1989 for use with the company's games. The MSRP of the card was around US$425 (equivalent to $1,080 in 2024).

The LAPC-I is one of few ISA cards that require a power supply with a -5V rail.

== History ==
Sierra On-Line was instrumental in working with Roland Corporation in introducing high-end sound modules and sound cards in the mainstream computer game market in the late 1980s through early 1990s.

The card came with no software or accessories, although no specific software was necessary, since the MT-32 appeared as a MIDI peripheral connected to the MPU-401 on MIDI channels 2 through 10. To connect the LAPC-I to other MIDI devices, an MCB-1 module is required.

A model called the LAPC-N was also released for the Japanese NEC PC-98 system. To connect the LAPC-N to other MIDI devices, an MCB-2 module is required.

The card was and is often mistakenly called LAPC-1, but photos of the card's PCB and retail box show a capital letter I rather than a figure 1. Further evidence can be found in the owners manual which mentions the LAPC-I and also MCB-1, clearly showing specific use of I instead of 1. The "I" presumably stands for "IBM PC", and the "N" for NEC. Further confusion may have also occurred as Roland's own marketing materials such as magazine ads referred to the card as the Roland LAPC-1.
