= Roland D-05 =

Roland D-05 Boutique (Roland D-05)
- Manufacturer: Roland
- Dates: 2017-
- Price: US$460 US £350 GBP; JP¥50,000 JPY

Technical specifications
- Polyphony: 16 voices, 8 voices (Dual or Split mode)
- Timbrality: 2-part
- Oscillator: 32 partials with 2 per voice; 4 per voice in Dual or Split mode
- LFO: 3
- Synthesis type: Linear arithmetic synthesis Digital Circuit Behavior (DCB)
- Filter: low-pass resonant filter referred to as a Time Variant Filter (TVF)
- Attenuator: ADSR envelope referred to as Time Variant Amplifier (TVA)
- Aftertouch expression: Yes
- Velocity expression: Yes
- Storage memory: Preset Patch 64 x 6, User Patch 64 x 8, Pattern 64
- Effects: Reverb, Chorus, EQ

Input/output
- Keyboard: 25 keys with optional K-25m keyboard unit
- Left-hand control: Pitchbend / modulation ribbon controllers

The Roland D-05 is a synthesizer first manufactured in 2017. It is a smaller version of the Roland D-50 which was produced in 1987. The D-05 is part of the Roland's Boutique range of new and recreated synths. This particular Boutique module has additional functionality compared to its bigger brother. There is the addition of a Micro USB port that MIDI and audio from the unit can both be transmitted to and from a connected computer.

== Extra features ==
Extra features include an arpeggiator and a 64 step sequencer, sequence shuffle and has gate timing along with tempo and patch changes.

== Portability ==
The unit can be powered by batteries or from the USB port. Along with the optional K25m module and utilizing the D-05's built in speaker, it can be made into a self-contained, highly portable synthesizer.
