= Roland JD-990 =

Synthesizer

JD-990 Super JD
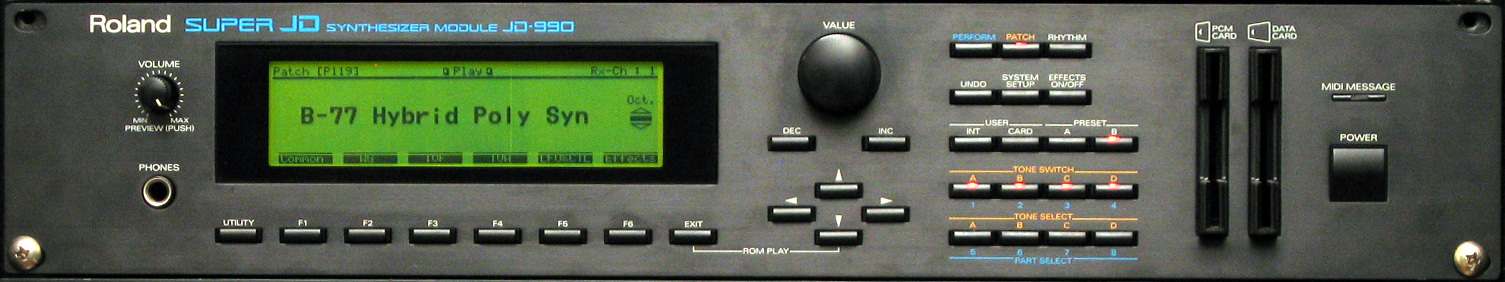
- JD-990
- Manufacturer: Roland
- Dates: 1993-1996
- Price: United States: $2,195; United Kingdom: £1,445

Technical specifications
- Polyphony: 24 voices
- Timbrality: 7 + 1 Drum part
- Oscillator: 6MB of PCM ROM with 195 waveforms (expandable to 16MB), 4 waveforms (tones) per patch
- LFO: 2 per patch
- Synthesis type: Digital Sample-based Subtractive
- Filter: TVF (Time Variant Filter): Lowpass/bandpass/highpass-filters with resonance
- Attenuator: TVA envelopes, TVF envelopes and pitch envelopes
- Aftertouch expression: Yes
- Velocity expression: Yes
- Storage memory: 3 banks of 64 patches (expandable), 3 drum kits with 61 sounds
- Effects: Chorus, Reverb, Delay, Phaser, Spectrum, Enhancer, Distortion and EQ

Input/output
- Keyboard: No
- External control: MIDI

The Roland JD-990 Super JD is an updated version of the Roland JD-800 synthesizer in the form of a module with expanded capabilities, which was released in 1993 by Roland Corporation. JD-990 is a multitimbral synthesizer utilising PCM sample-based synthesis technology. In a sense it is not a true module version of a JD-800 as it has many expanded features and as a result the two are incompatible in exchanging presets. It is equipped with 6 MB of ROM containing sampled PCM waveforms, four sets of stereo outputs that are assignable to individual, internal, instruments, and standard MIDI in/out/through ports. JD-990 has a large LCD and programming takes place through a keypad on the front panel of the unit. The unit can generate multi-timbral sounds reminiscent of the vintage analogue synthesizers but is also capable of generation of modern digital textures. There are several expansion boards available for JD-990 that can be installed in the provided expansion slot in the chassis of the unit.

== Features ==
The JD-990 had the following features which were not available on the JD-800:

1. Expanded wave ROM (6 MB vs. 3 MB)
2. Ability to use an 8 MB expansion board from the SR-JV80 series
3. JV-80 patch import
4. 4 additional outputs
5. Individual panning of each tone in a patch
6. Oscillator sync
7. Frequency cross-modulation (FXM)
8. Matrix Modulation
9. Available Palette type editing of each parameter for four oscillators simultaneously
10. Modulation of the same destination from multiple sources
11. Available dual-oscillator synthesis Structures featuring ring modulation and/or serial dual filters (uses 2 polyphony)
12. Additional LFO waveforms: sine, trapezoid and chaos
13. MIDI CC control of parameters
14. Tempo sync delay
15. Polyphonic portamento
16. Analog Feel. Adds a very subtle pitch modulation to the basic waveforms intended to recreate an analogue synth's 'drift'
17. Performance Mode Multitimbral Parts increased to 7+1 (from 5+1)
18. Performance Mode Multitimbral multiple memories (16 User/32 ROM/Optional 16 Memory Card)
19. One patch can keep full effects in Multitimbral Performance Mode ("Part 1 Super Synthesizer")

== Expandability ==
The JD-990 is compatible with the following:

- The SR-JV80 series of expansion boards. The SR-JV80-04 Vintage Synth board includes 255 patches programmed specially for the JD-990.
- The SL-JD80 series of waveform & patch cards released for the JD-800.
- The SO-PCM1 series of waveform cards.
- The JD9D series of patch cards developed specifically for the JD-990.

== Factory Sounds ==
The Factory presets of the JD-990 were created by Eric Persing and Adrian Scott.

== Notable users ==
The JD-990 has been used by artists such as Klaus Schulze, Paul Shaffer, Steve Duda, Vangelis, The Prodigy, Apollo 440, ATB, and Mirwais. Apollo 440 used the JD-990 for atmospheric sounds on the track "The Machine in the Ghost", on the album Gettin' High on Your Own Supply. On the Faithless song "Insomnia", the pizzicato hook is from a JD-990, with added reverb. Ronnie Martin from Joy Electric also used the JD-990 to synthesise every sound heard on the "We Are The Music Makers" album before moving onto more vintage synthesisers.
