= Roland Cloud =

Subscription service

Roland Cloud is a subscription-based collection of VST instruments and 'RVR' sample libraries launched in early 2018 by Roland. Instrument downloads and installation are handled by Roland's Cloud Manager software.

The software instruments available via Roland Cloud also include features that were not available in the original hardware instruments from which they were based. They are produced by Roland along with Virtual Sonics, an audio company founded by video game composer Jeremy Soule and his brother Julian.
