= Roland V-Synth =

Synthesizer introduced in 2003

V-Synth
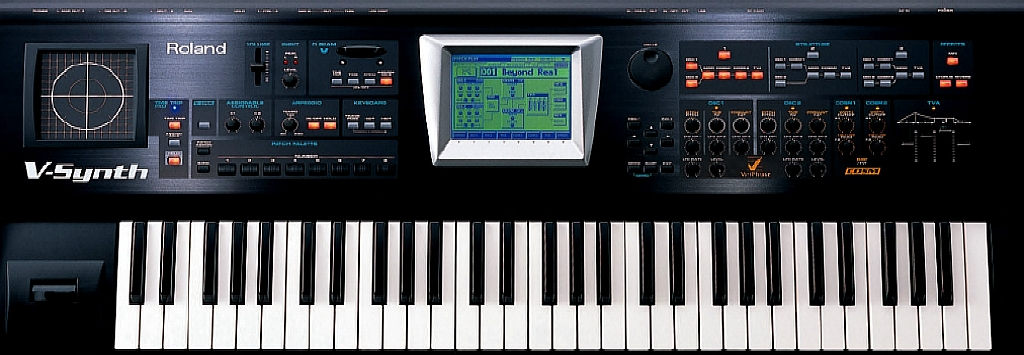
- Manufacturer: Roland Corporation
- Dates: V-Synth: 2003; V-Synth XT: 2005; V-Synth GT: 2007
- Price: £1999 V-Synth GBP £2231 V-Synth XT GBP

Technical specifications
- Polyphony: 24 voices
- Timbrality: 16 part
- Oscillator: Dual Oscillators
- LFO: 2 (Sample & Hold, Saw Up, Saw Down, Sine, Square, Triangle, Clocked, Delay, Freerun, Key Sync)
- Synthesis type: ROMpler, Sampling, SuperSaw, Virtual Analog
- Filter: 1 (12dB Slope (2-pole), 24dB Slope (4-pole), Band Pass, Comb, High Pass, Low Pass, Notch, Resonance)
- Aftertouch expression: Yes
- Velocity expression: Yes
- Storage memory: 1 Project; 512 Patches; 999 Waves
- Effects: 41 multi effects, 8 x Chorus, 10 x Reverb

Input/output
- Keyboard: 61 keys
- Left-hand control: Pitch bend / Modulation bender
- External control: MIDI In, out, thru USB

The Roland V-Synth is a polyphonic synthesizer. It was released in 2003 and was Roland's flagship synthesizer at the time. It combines multiple oscillator technologies and a built in sampler. It also features an arpeggiator and COSM filtering to aid the creation of new sounds.

The V-Synth is compatible with Roland's VC-1 and VC-2 cards. The VC-2 switches its oscillators into a mode where the keyboard operates as a multichannel vocoder and vocal synthesiser.

== Features ==
- Touchscreen
- The Timetrip pad which allows real-time manipulation of waveforms
- V-LINK Onboard Video Control
- Twin D Beams

== Construction ==
Built in a black metal case it has plastic end cheeks. The buttons on the unit are backlit.

== Models ==
- V-Synth XT 2005 - Rack-mount module (minus D-Beams and Trip Pad). Pre-installed with Roland's VC-1 (D-50 emulator) and VC-2 (Vocal Designer)
- V-Synth GT 2007 - Adds Roland's Vocal Designer technology. Has a maximum 28 voices of polyphony.

== Notable users ==
- Asia
- BT
- cEvin Key
- Crystal Castles
- Enigma
- Jens Johansson
- Jesper Kyd
- Jordan Rudess
- Klystron
- Ladytron
- Michael Pinnella
- Nick Rhodes
- Orbital
- Richard Barbieri
- Teddy Riley
- The Crystal Method
- Skinny Puppy
