= Roland Corporation =

Japanese musical equipment manufacturer

- Type: Public
- Traded as: TYO: 7944
- Industry: Electronics
- Founded: 18 April 1972; 54 years ago in Osaka, Japan
- Founder: Ikutaro Kakehashi
- Headquarters: Hamamatsu, Shizuoka, Japan
- Key people: Masahiro Minowa
- Products: Electronic musical instruments, synthesizers, digital pianos, electronic drums, guitar amplifiers, guitar synthesizers, effects units, mixing consoles, digital recorders, DJ controllers, vision mixers, accordions
- Brands: Boss; Drum Workshop; Waza
- Revenue: ¥102.4 billion ($668 million) (2023)
- Number of employees: 2,783 (2022)
- Website: roland.com

Roland Corporation (ローランド株式会社, Rōrando Kabushiki Kaisha) is a Japanese multinational manufacturer of electronic musical instruments, electronic equipment and software. It was founded by Ikutaro Kakehashi in Osaka in 1972. In 2005, its headquarters relocated to Hamamatsu in Shizuoka Prefecture. It has factories in Malaysia, Taiwan, Japan and the US. As of December 2022, it employed 2,783 people. In 2014, it was subject to a management buyout by its CEO, Junichi Miki, supported by Taiyo Pacific Partners.

Roland has manufactured numerous instruments that have had lasting impacts on music, such as the Juno-106 synthesizer, the TB-303 bass synthesizer, and the TR-808 and TR-909 drum machines. It was also instrumental in the development of MIDI, a standardized means of synchronizing electronic instruments manufactured by different companies. In 2016, Fact wrote that Roland had perhaps been more influential on electronic music than any other company.

== History ==
=== Background ===
Roland founder Ikutaro Kakehashi had founded Ace Electronic Industries in 1960, with Ace having designed and manufactured electronic organs, drum machines, instrument amplifiers, and effects pedals. In March 1972, after one of Ace's major investors, Sakata Shokai, was acquired by Sumitomo Chemical (an industrial company with no interest in the music industry), Kakehashi resigned.

=== 1970s ===
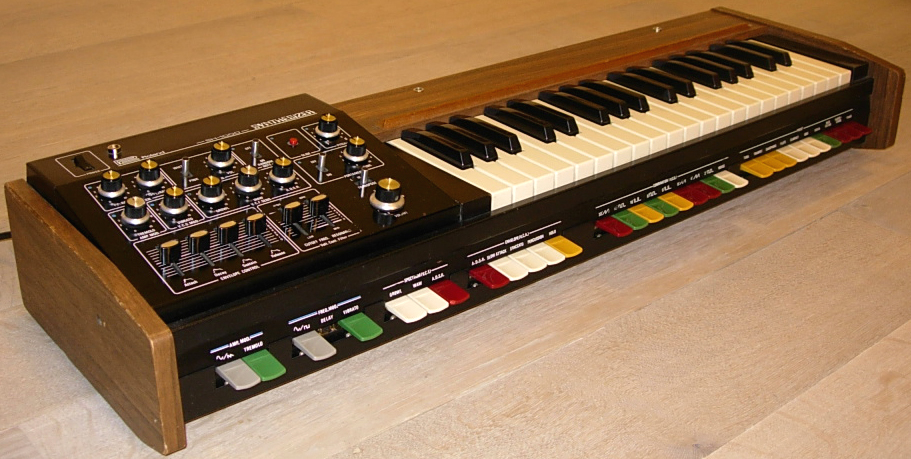
SH-1000 (1973)

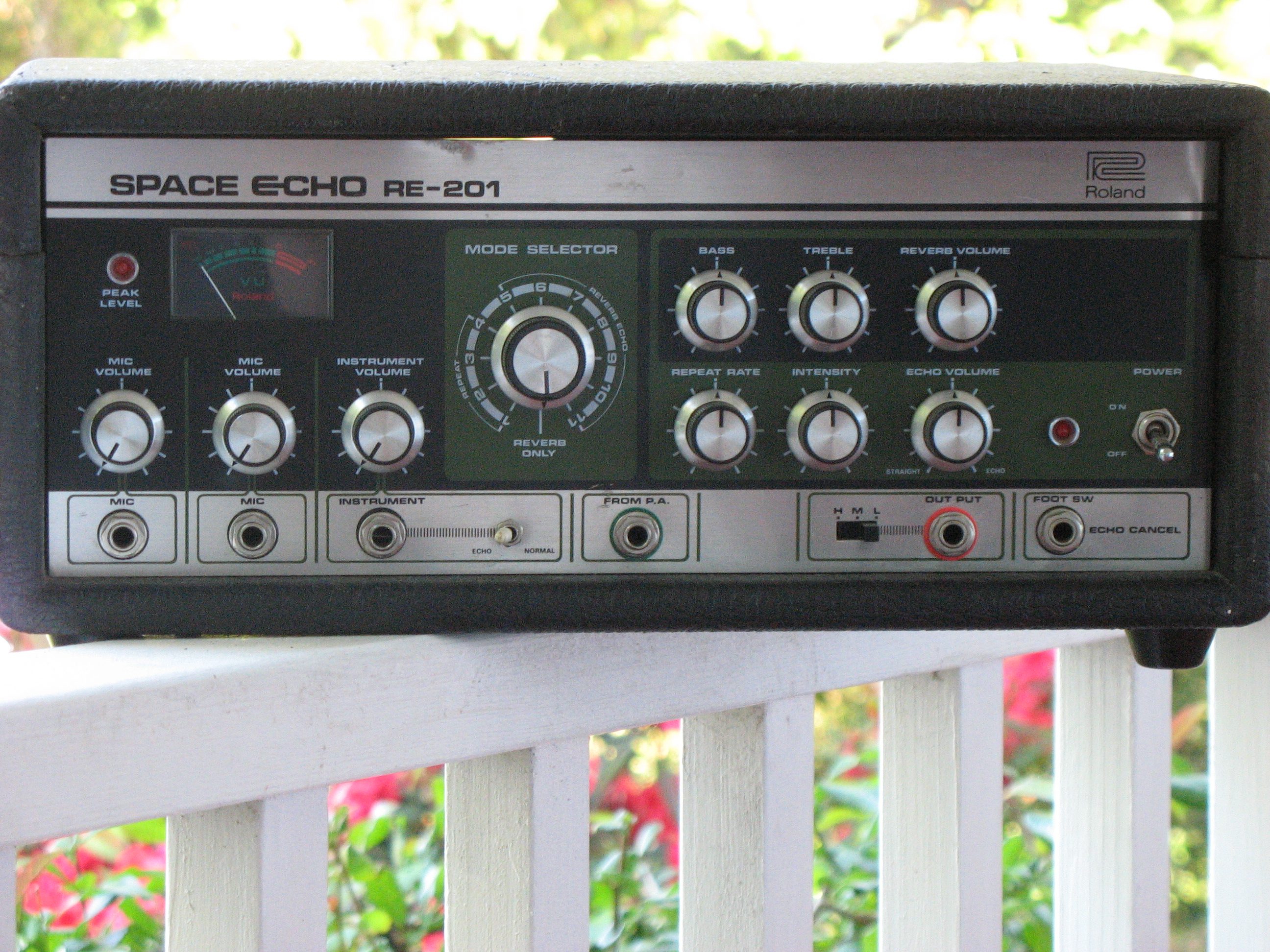
RE-201 Space Echo (1976)

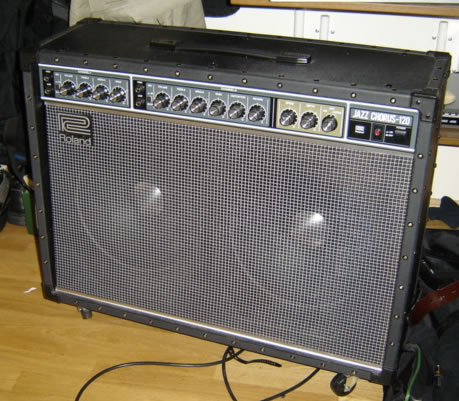
JC-120 Jazz Chorus (1975)

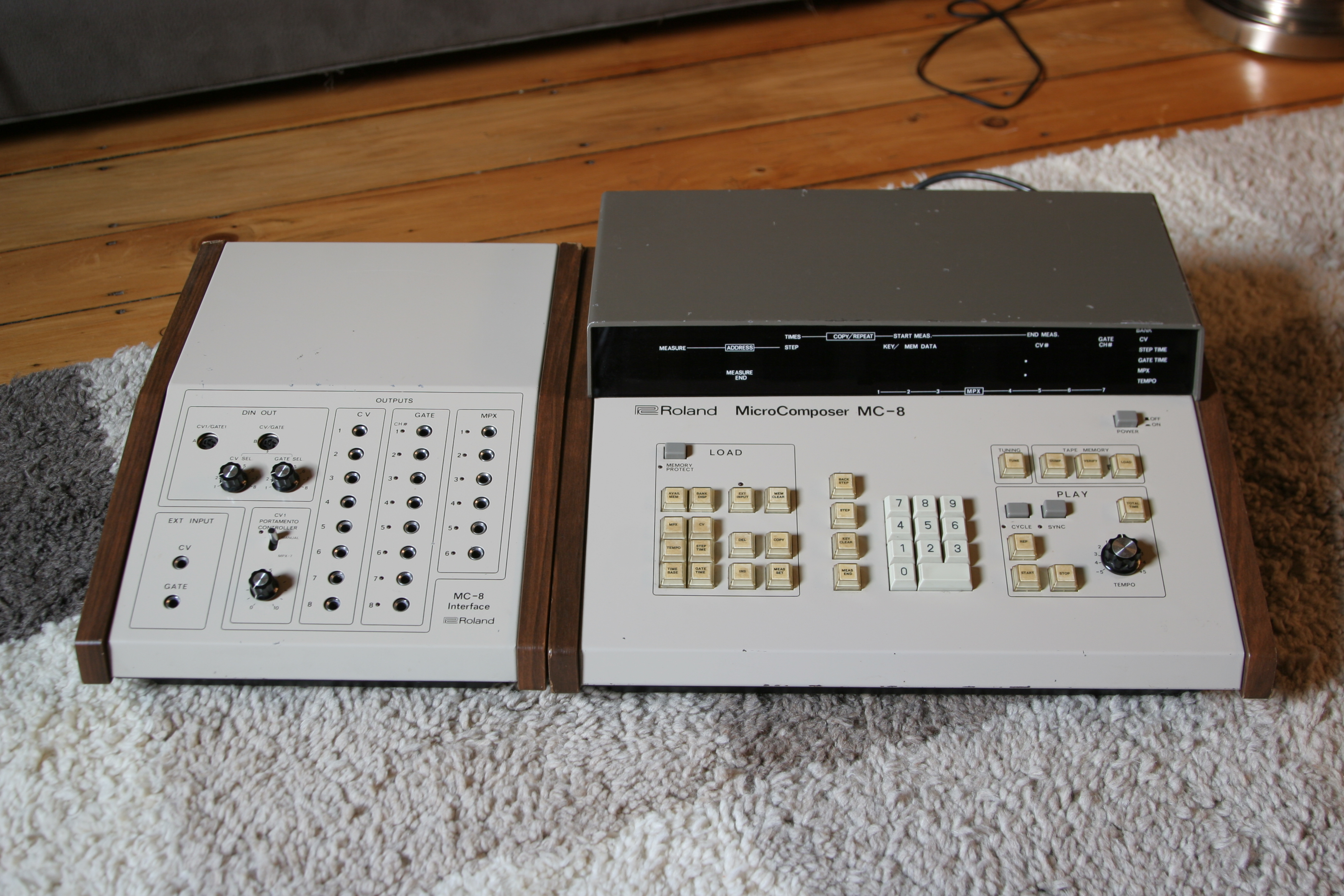
MC-8 MicroComposer (1977)

On 18 April 1972, just a month after resigning from Ace, Kakehashi founded Roland in Osaka. Kakehashi, who had no musical training, wanted to appeal to amateurs and hobbyists, and focused on miniaturization, affordability, and simplicity.

The "Roland" name was selected for export purposes, as Kakehashi was interested in a name that was easy to pronounce for his worldwide target markets. The name was found in a telephone directory, and Kakehashi was satisfied with the simple two-syllable word and its soft consonants. The letter "R" was chosen because it was not used by many other music equipment companies, so would stand out in trade-show directories and industry listings. Kakehashi did not learn of the French epic poem The Song of Roland until later.

With seven employees from his former company, a rented shed, and $100,000, Kakehashi built on his experience at Ace, introducing a drum machine, the TR-77 or Rhythm 77, as Roland's first product, followed by the TR-33 and TR-55 released that same year. In 1973, Roland introduced the first compact synthesizer produced in Japan and the first synthesizer produced by Roland, the SH-1000, as well as their first non-preset synthesizer, the SH-3.

The company was also manufacturing effects units, introducing the RE-201 Space Echo in 1974, and expanding into guitar amplifiers the following year with the JC-60 and JC-120 Jazz Chorus, whose chorus circuit would become the first BOSS product, the CE-1 Chorus Ensemble, the following year. In 1976, Roland introduced the semi-modular System 100 and the modular System 700 synthesizers.

In 1977, the company introduced one of the earliest microprocessor-driven music sequencers, the MC-8 MicroComposer, and the first guitar synthesizer, the GR-500. One year later, they introduced the CompuRhythm CR-78, the first drum machine that enabled users to program and store their own drum patterns.

=== 1980s ===
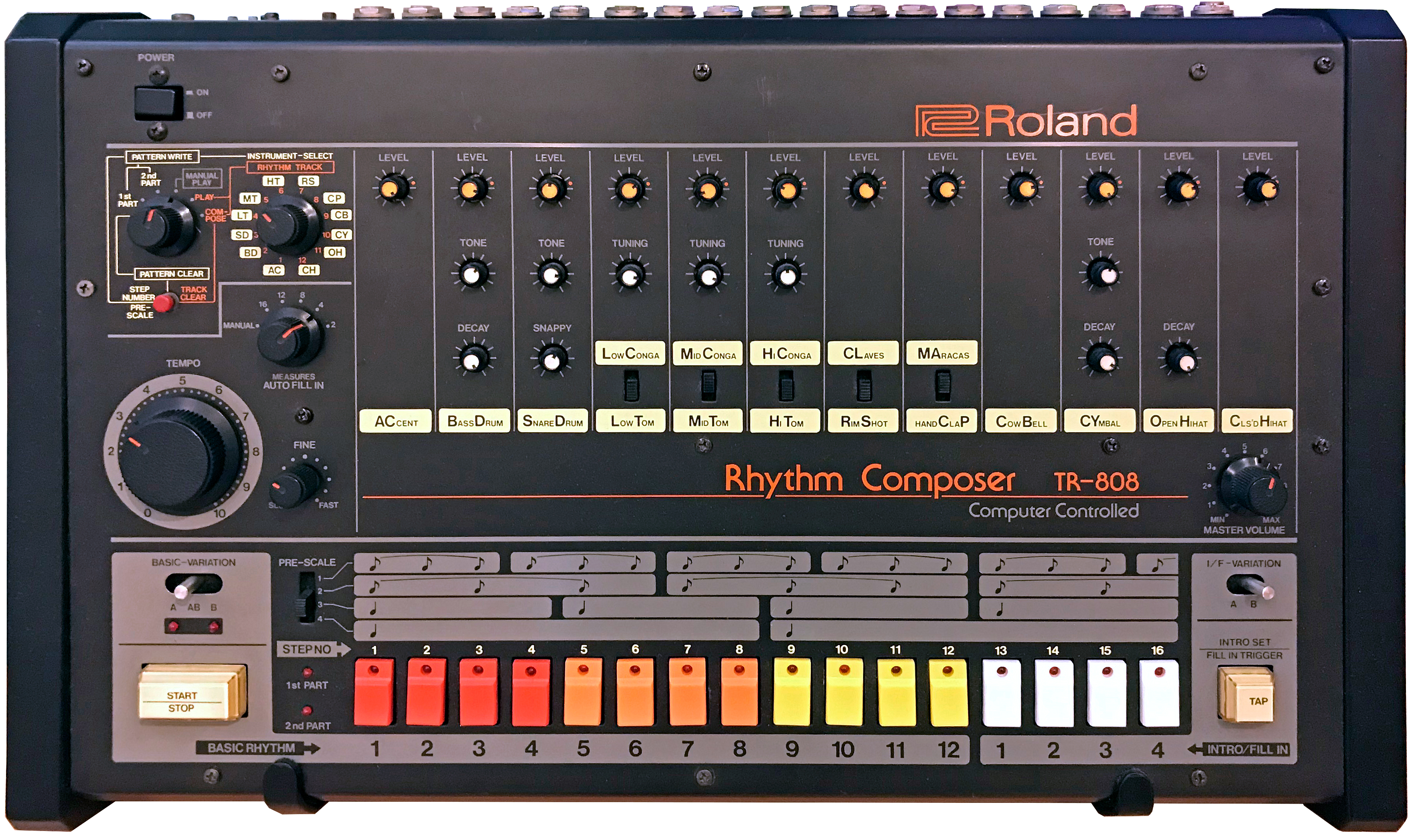
TR-808 (1980)

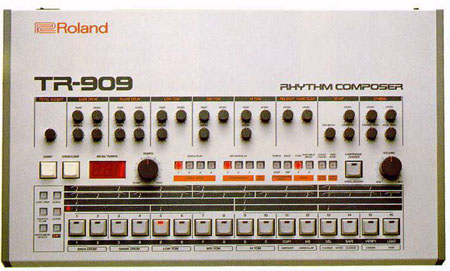
TR-909 (1983)

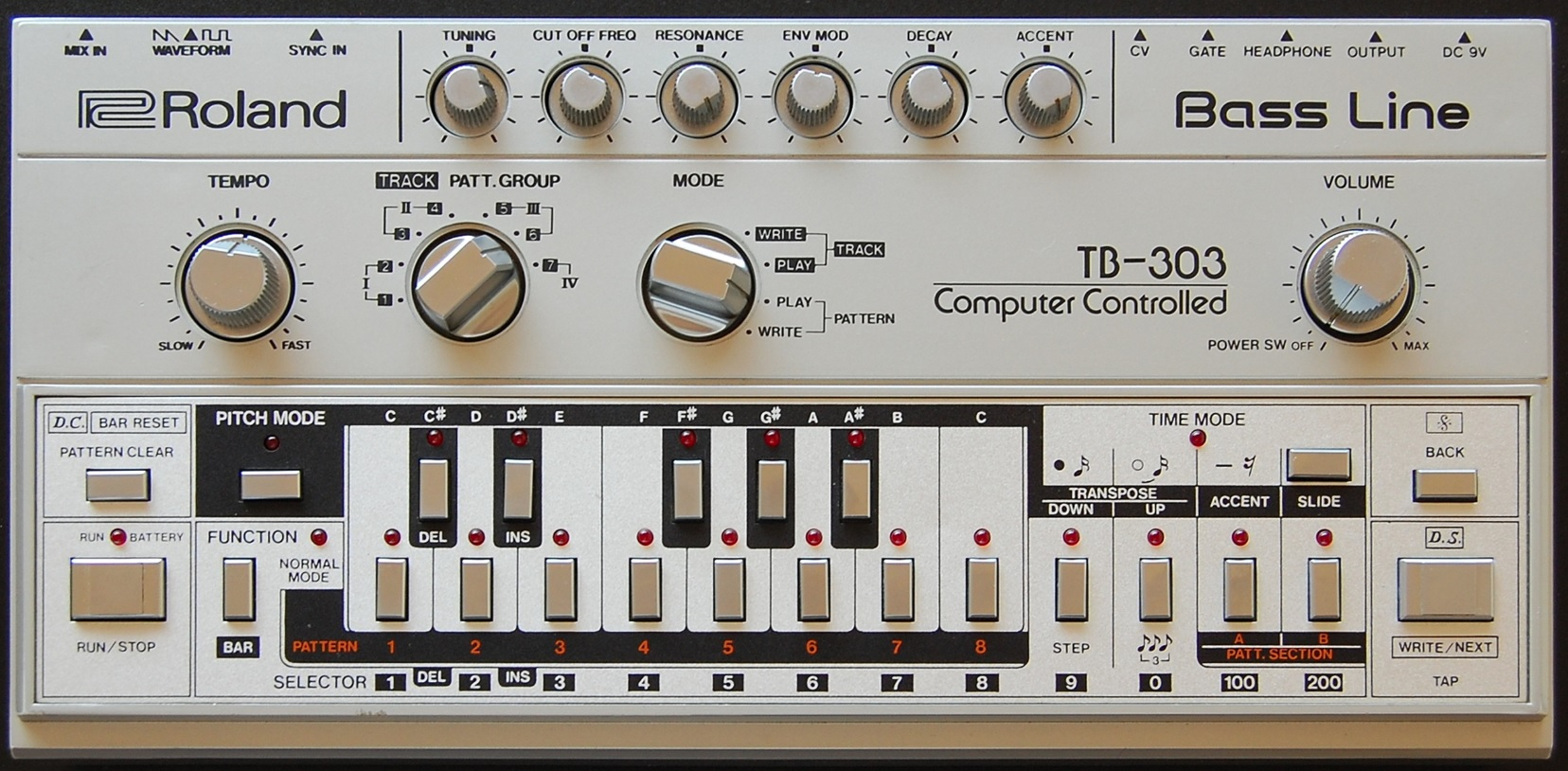
TB-303 (1981)

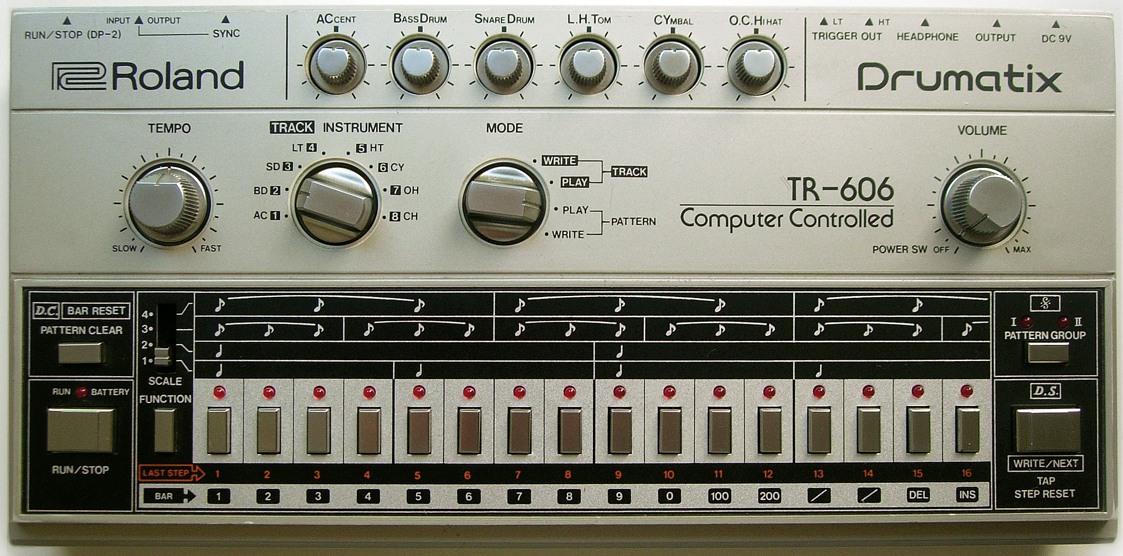
TR-606 (1981)

Following the bankruptcy of its European distributor in 1980, Roland established new distribution companies in the UK, Germany, Scandinavia, and Switzerland the following year. Over the next several years, Roland released several instruments that have had a lasting influence on popular music. After Kakehashi realized microprocessors could be used to program drum machines, Roland launched the TR-808, its first programmable drum machine, in 1980. Although it was not an immediate commercial success, the 808 was eventually used on more hit records than any other drum machine and became a cornerstone of the emerging electronic and hip hop genres. It has been described as hip hop's equivalent to the Fender Stratocaster guitar, which dramatically influenced the development of rock music. The 808 was followed in 1983 by the TR-909, which, alongside the TB-303 bass synthesizer, influenced the development of dance music such as techno, house, and acid.

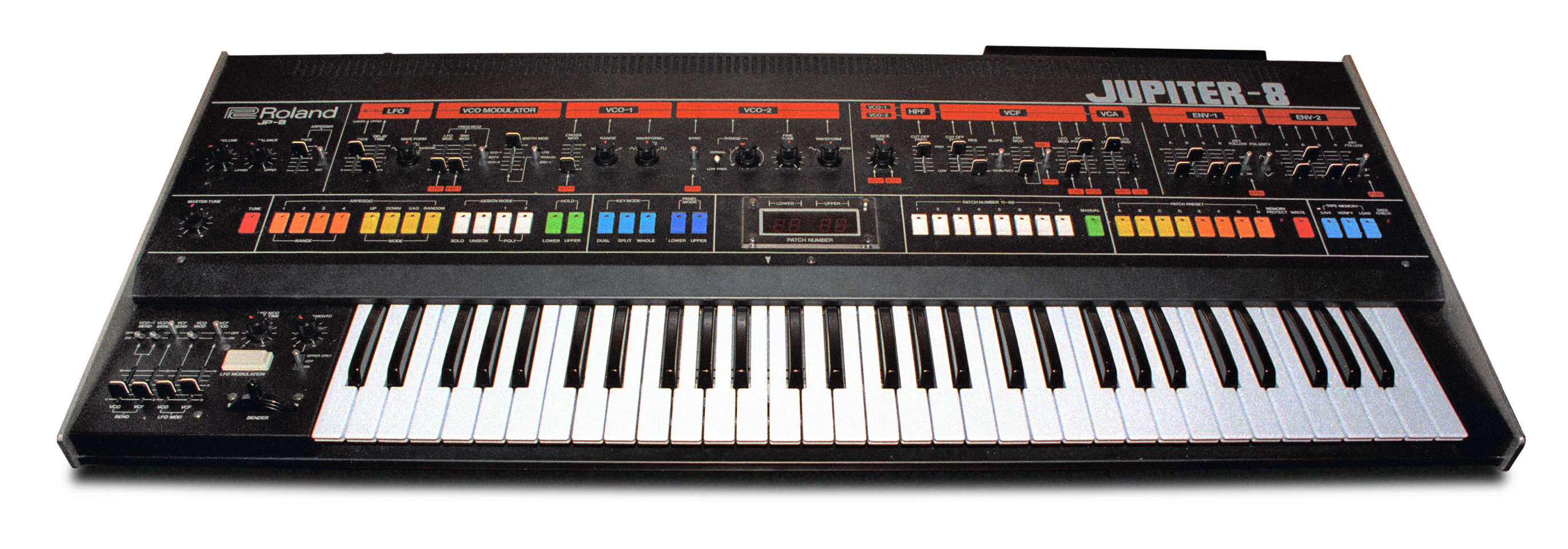
Jupiter-8 (1981)

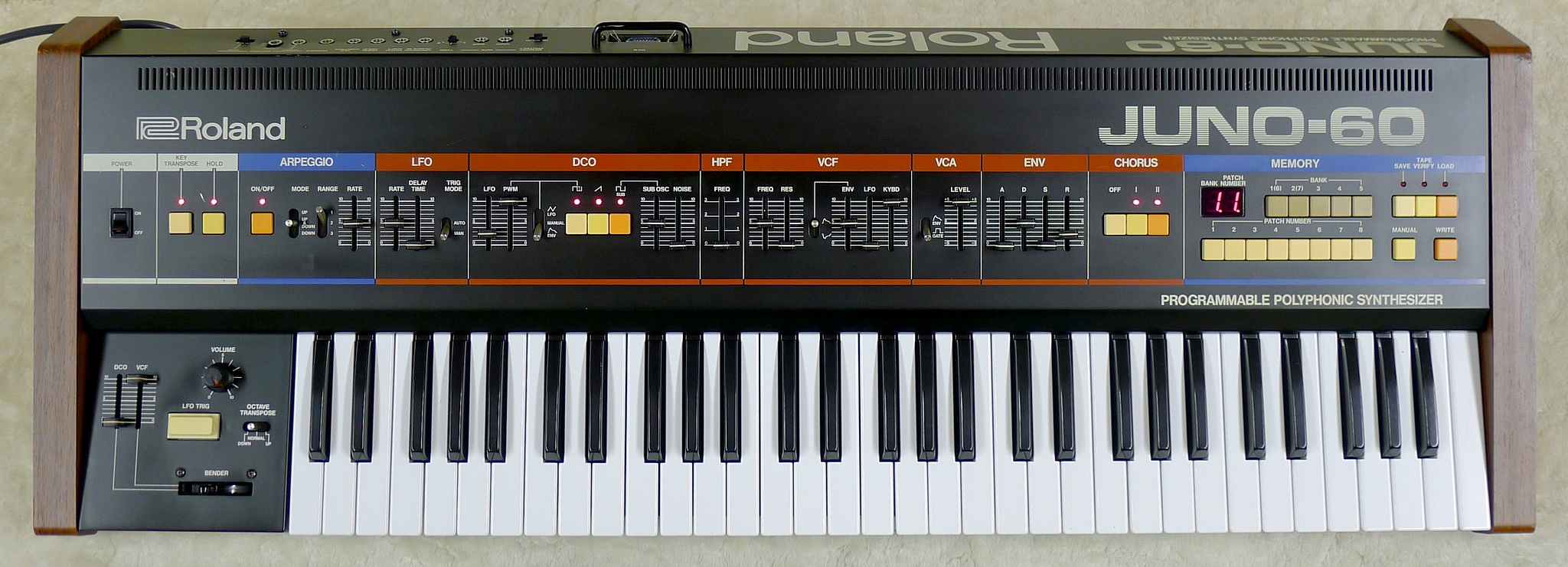
Juno-60 (1982)

Roland released a flagship synthesizer, the Jupiter-8 in 1981, and introduced the SH-101 analog monosynth and the first Juno-series polysynths, the Juno-6 and Juno-60, the following year. Roland played a key role in the development of MIDI, a standardized means of synchronizing electronic musical instruments manufactured by different companies. Kakehashi proposed developing a standard with representatives from Oberheim, Sequential Circuits, Yamaha, Korg, and Kawai. He and Dave Smith of Sequential Circuits unveiled MIDI in 1983. It remains the industry standard.

The company introduced the first JX-series synthesizer, the 6-voice JX-3P, in 1983; the 6-voice JX-8P and 12-voice JX-10 followed in 1985 and 1986. The D-50, which popularized sample-based synthesis, was introduced in 1987, and was the bestselling synth that year.

=== 1990s ===
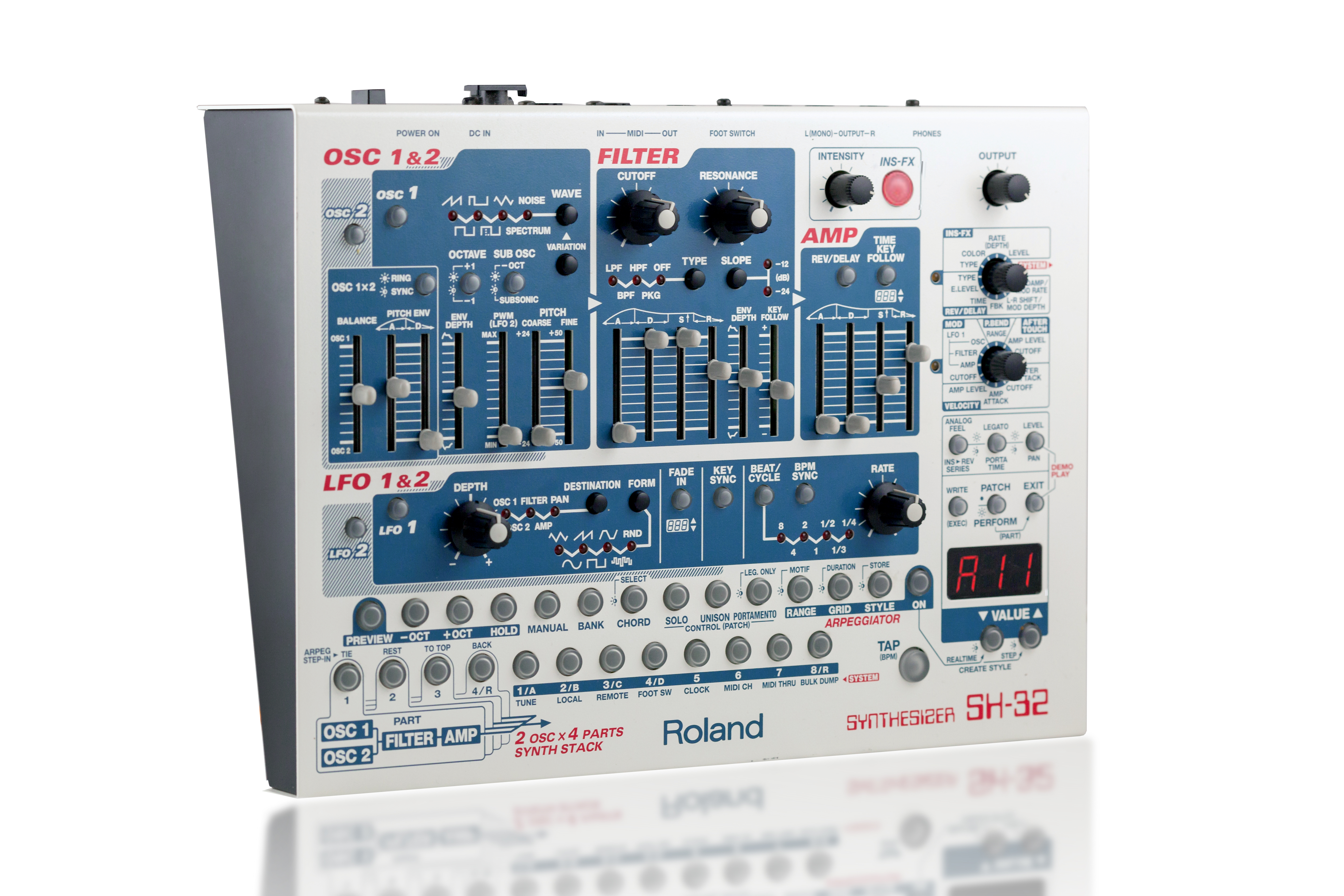
Roland SH-32 WAS Synthesizer

In, 1991 Roland released the JD-800, a digital synthesizer with many sliders. In 1993, they released the JD-990, which is the rackmount version of the JD-800. In 1994, Kakehashi founded the Roland Foundation and became chairman. In 1995, he was appointed the chairman of Roland Corporation.

=== 2000s ===
In 2001, Kakehashi resigned as chair of Roland Corporation and was appointed as a special executive adviser. In 2002, he published an autobiography, I Believe in Music. His second book, An Age Without Samples: Originality and Creativity in the Digital World, was published in 2017.

=== 2010s ===
In 2018, Roland launched a subscription service called Roland Cloud. Users of the service can download and emulate a number of Roland synthesizers (modelled through a proprietary paradigm called ACB) and drum machines in audio plugin formats. This collection also includes orchestral modules (namely the Roland SRX racks) and new additions such as original sampled instruments.

=== 2020s ===
Throughout 2022, Roland celebrated its 50th anniversary by releasing two new editions of their Space Echo tape delay through their Boss brand, along with selling commemorative merchandise and clothing through their online streetswear shop Roland Lifestyle. Later on, a collaboration with Dais Records was announced on 8 June ahead of the release of the JUNO-X synthesizer the following month. A new Jupiter-4 emulation for Roland Cloud and an NFT collection also materialised in the summer and autumn respectively.

Roland released a new line of synthesizers, with a brand new format called the Boutique line. The aim was to create compact synthesizer modules that would either emulate, or be inspired by older retro Roland synthesizer models of the 80's and 90's. Although slightly controversial with the public on release, due to the compact size, they have been a commercial success for Roland, with new models being regularly added to the Boutique line.

== Brands ==
Roland markets products under a number of brand names, each of which is used on products geared toward a different niche.

- The Roland brand is used on a wide range of products including synthesizers, digital pianos, electronically enhanced accordions, electronic drum systems, dance and DJ gear, guitar synthesizers, amplifiers, and recording products. Many of these products are now also available through Roland Cloud, a VST subscription service.
- Boss is a brand used for products geared toward guitar players, and is used for guitar pedals, effects units, rhythm and accompaniment machines, guitar amplifiers, and portable recording equipment.
- Edirol was a line of professional video-editing and video-presentation systems, as well as portable digital audio recorders. Edirol also had Desktop Media (DTM) products, more production-oriented, and included computer audio interfaces, mixers, and speakers. Following Roland's purchase of a controlling interest in Cakewalk Software, most of the division's products were rebranded as Cakewalk products or blended with the professional audio/RSS products to form Roland Systems Group.
- Roland Systems Group is a line of professional commercial audio and video products.
- Amdek was incorporated in 1981 "as a manufacturer of computerized music peripherals and as a distributor of assembled electronic music instrument parts." The Amdek brand is best remembered for a series of user-assembled effects pedals and accessories, marketed until 1983; at least 16 kits are known to have existed. Amdek's primary focus was on the potential uses of personal computers to assist musicians, and in 1982 they introduced the DXY-100, the company's first pen plotter, with the intent of allowing users to print out their own sheet music. Soon realizing the printer had a much larger market potential, in 1983 Amdek became the Roland DG Corporation.

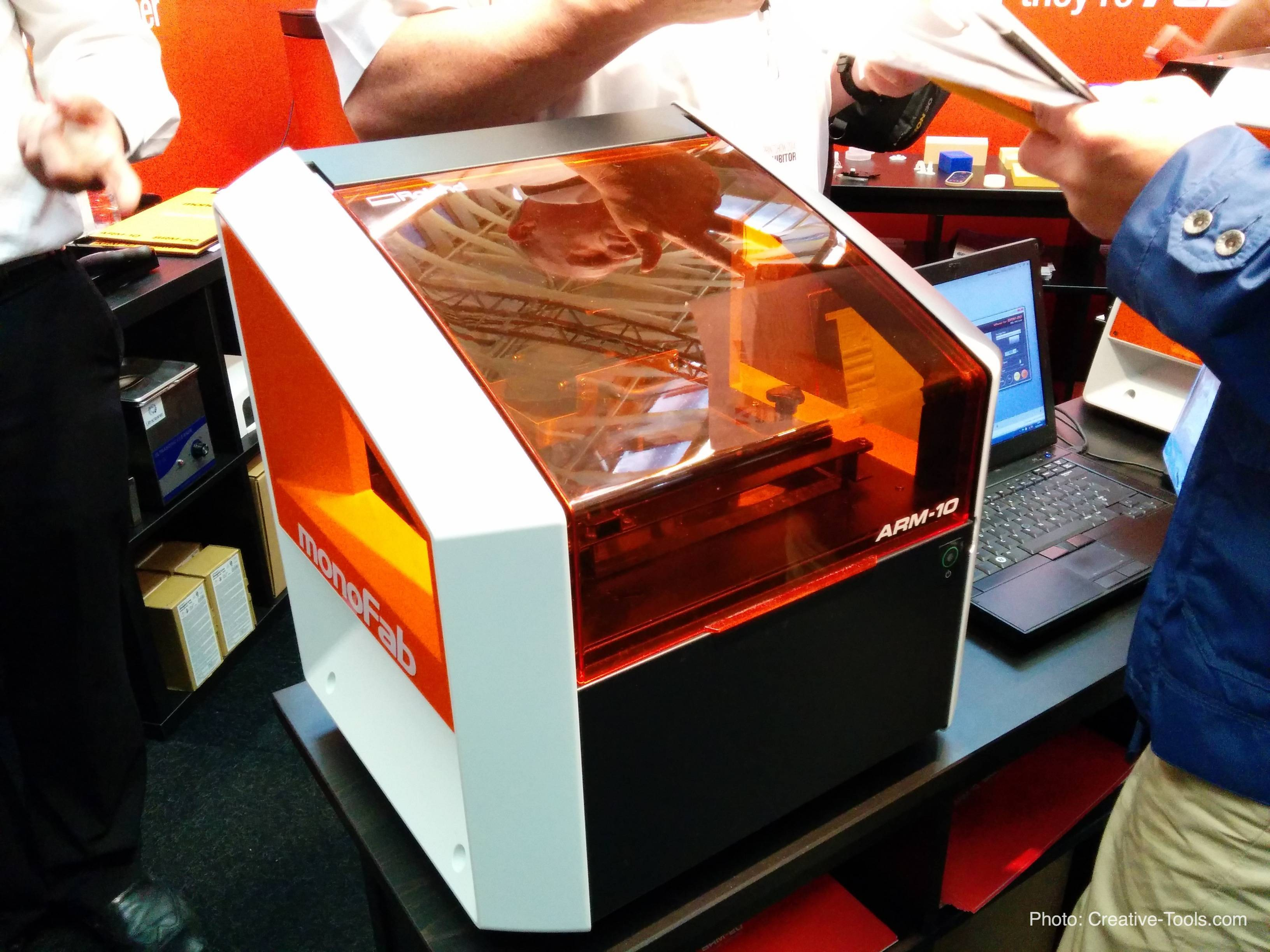
monoFab's ARM-10 SLA 3D printer

- Roland DG is a company in digital printing and engraving technology, produces computerized vinyl cutters, thermal-transfer printer/cutters, wide-format inkjet printers and printer/cutters, 3D scanners, and dental milling devices, and engravers. In 2014, Roland DG entered the 3D printing market with the launch of its monoFab series, featuring the ARM-10 3D printer.
- In 1987, Roland acquired the then-defunct Rhodes name, and released a number of digital keyboards bearing the Rhodes brand. Harold Rhodes had regained the rights to the name in 2000 prior to his death that same year. He was dissatisfied with Roland's treatment of the brand but died before he was able to bring a new model to market.
- V-MODA designs and develops "world‑class high‑fidelity headphones and audio devices" and became a part of the Roland family on 8 August 2016 also known as 808 Day.
