= Yamaha PSR-E323 =

Electronic keyboard

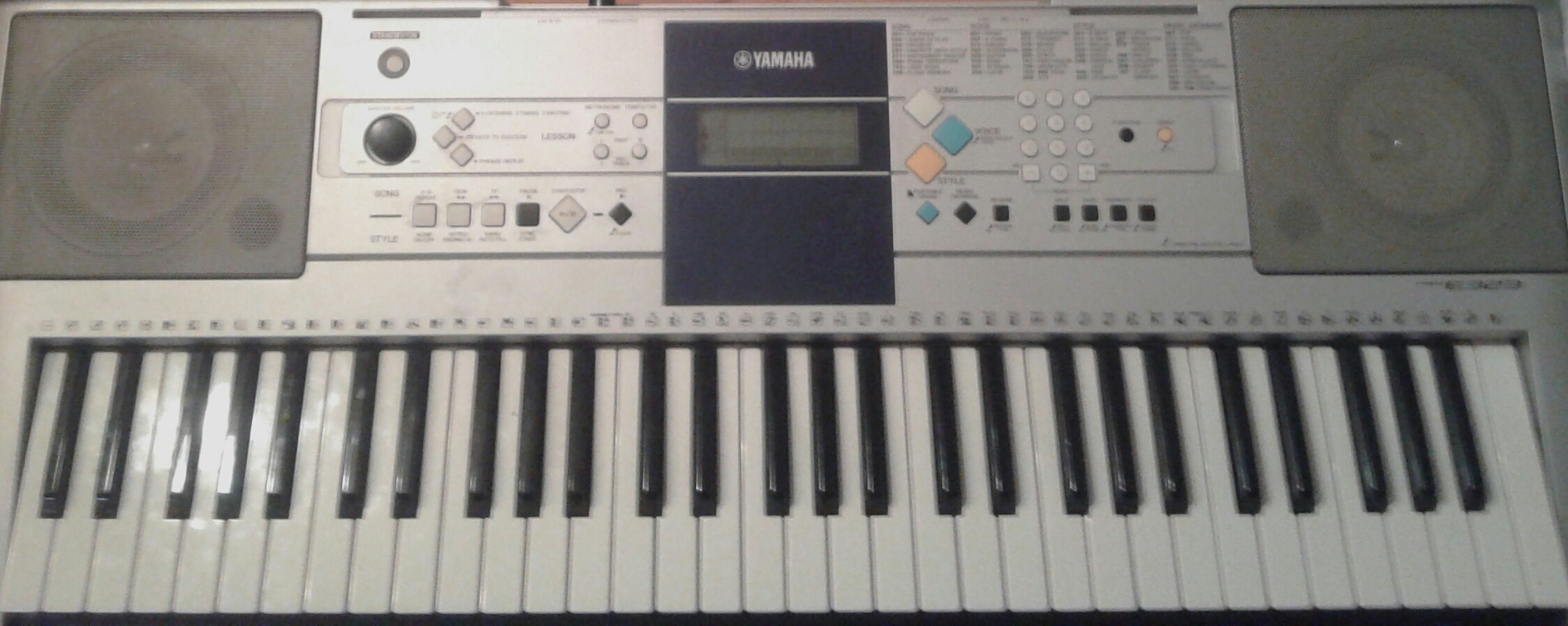
- Yamaha PSR-E323
- Manufacturer: Yamaha
- Dates: 2009

Technical specifications
- Polyphony: 32 notes
- Timbrality: 16-part multi-timbral, General MIDI compatible
- Synthesis type: PCM sample-based synthesis (Yamaha Advanced Wave Memory)
- Velocity expression: 3-level adjustable dynamic velocity
- Storage memory: 64 Mbit wave sample ROM; 373 KiB EEPROM
- Effects: Reverb; Chorus; Dynamic stereo sampling (for piano sounds)

Input/output
- Keyboard: 61 keys
- External control: MIDI

The Yamaha PSR-E323, also known as the YPT-320, is an electronic keyboard manufactured by the Yamaha Corporation in 2009. It is a basic home keyboard intended for learning and personal use.

== Overview ==
The Yamaha PSR-E323 is an entry-level home electronic keyboard dedicated for beginner, learning and personal usage. It is positioned in the low-end class, competing with similar products such as the Casio LK-220 and CTK-3000.

The keyboard features velocity-sensitive keys with an adjustable sensitivity setting, a total of 482 instrument sounds including a stereo-sampled piano and a Yamaha XGlite soundset, a set of 106 auto-accompaniment rhythms, built-in lesson system for practicing, stereo bass reflex speakers, as well as over 100 built-in songs.

Like most electronic keyboards in general, the PSR-E323 is compatible with the MIDI standard, with integrated MIDI input/output jacks for connecting to a computer or other electronic instruments.

=== Sound engine ===
The keyboard contains a scaled-down version of Yamaha's Advanced Wave Memory (AWM) tone generation system, which is a PCM sample-based synthesis engine. The samples are an adaptation of Yamaha's earlier PortaTone series of home keyboards produced between 1997 and 2006, as well as the MU-series sound modules produced from 1994 to 2002.

It features 32-note polyphony with 16-part multi-timbral support and Yamaha XG Lite sound set.

One notable feature of the keyboard is "Portable Grand", a function that instantly sets the keyboard to a stereo-sampled piano sound. The piano sound consists of digital samples of a Yamaha grand piano dating back to the early-1990s, and was formerly used in digital pianos at the time such as YFP, YPP, and YPR series, as well as early models of Clavinova.

== Successors ==
Yamaha has produced a series of similar keyboards as direct successors to the PSR-E323; the PSR-E333 (2011), which maintains otherwise identical design, features and sounds, but with a black color, 3D stereo function, and a new plug-and-play USB connection replacing the traditional MIDI in/out ports; the PSR-E343 (2013), featuring a redesigned panel layout, new sounds, audio input (AUX) connection, and iOS device compatibility; the PSR-E353 (2015), featuring the same design and functions as its predecessor but with an improved sound engine, enhanced speaker system and grey finish; the PSR-E363 (2017) featuring a major redesign and improved sound system, alongside a 76-note version the (PSR-EW300), and the PSR-E373 (2020) featuring a new sound engine with Super Articulation Lite voices and a new concert grand piano sound, alongside its 76-note variant, the PSR-EW310.

== Gallery ==
YAMAHA PSR-E323
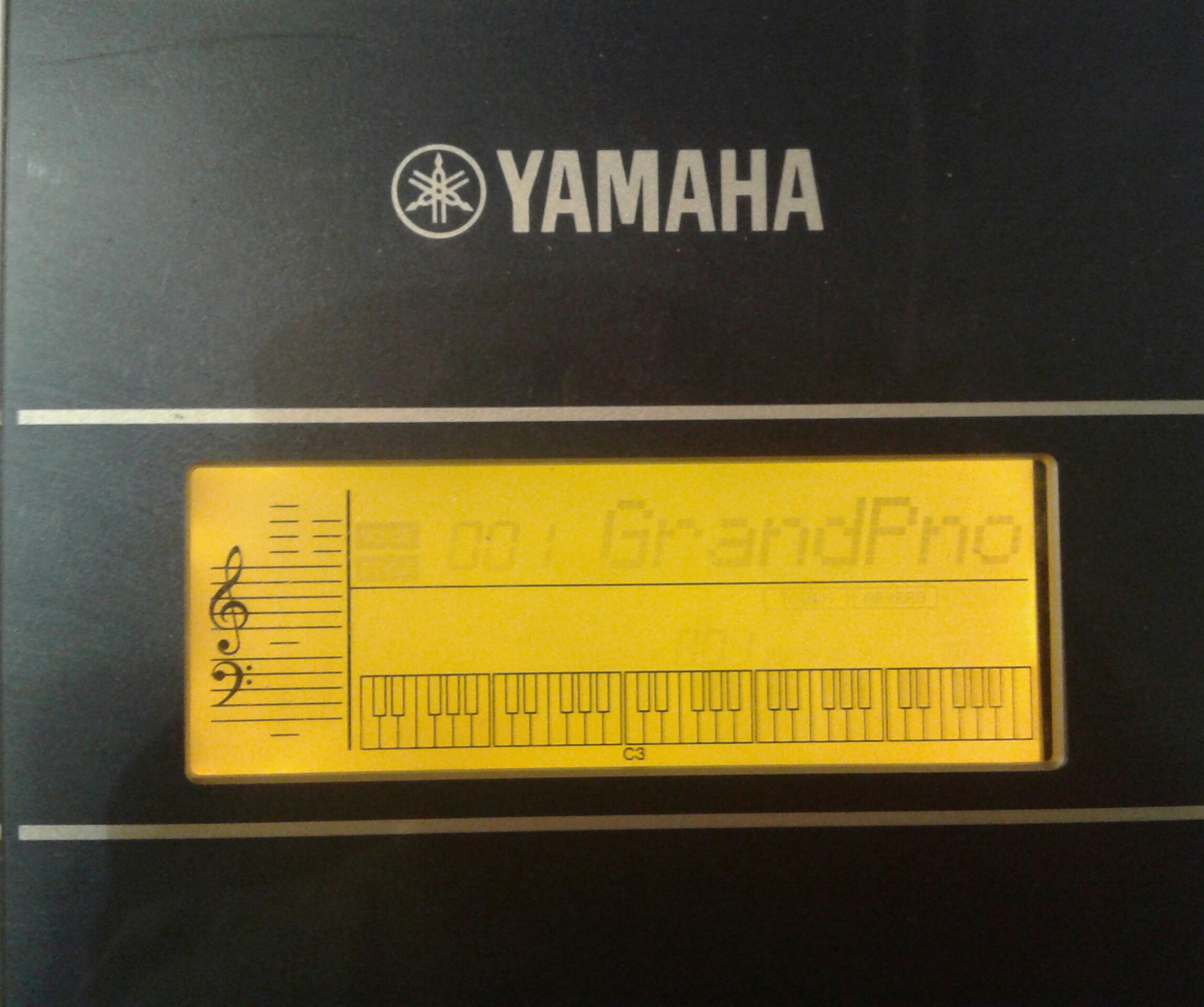
Home screen

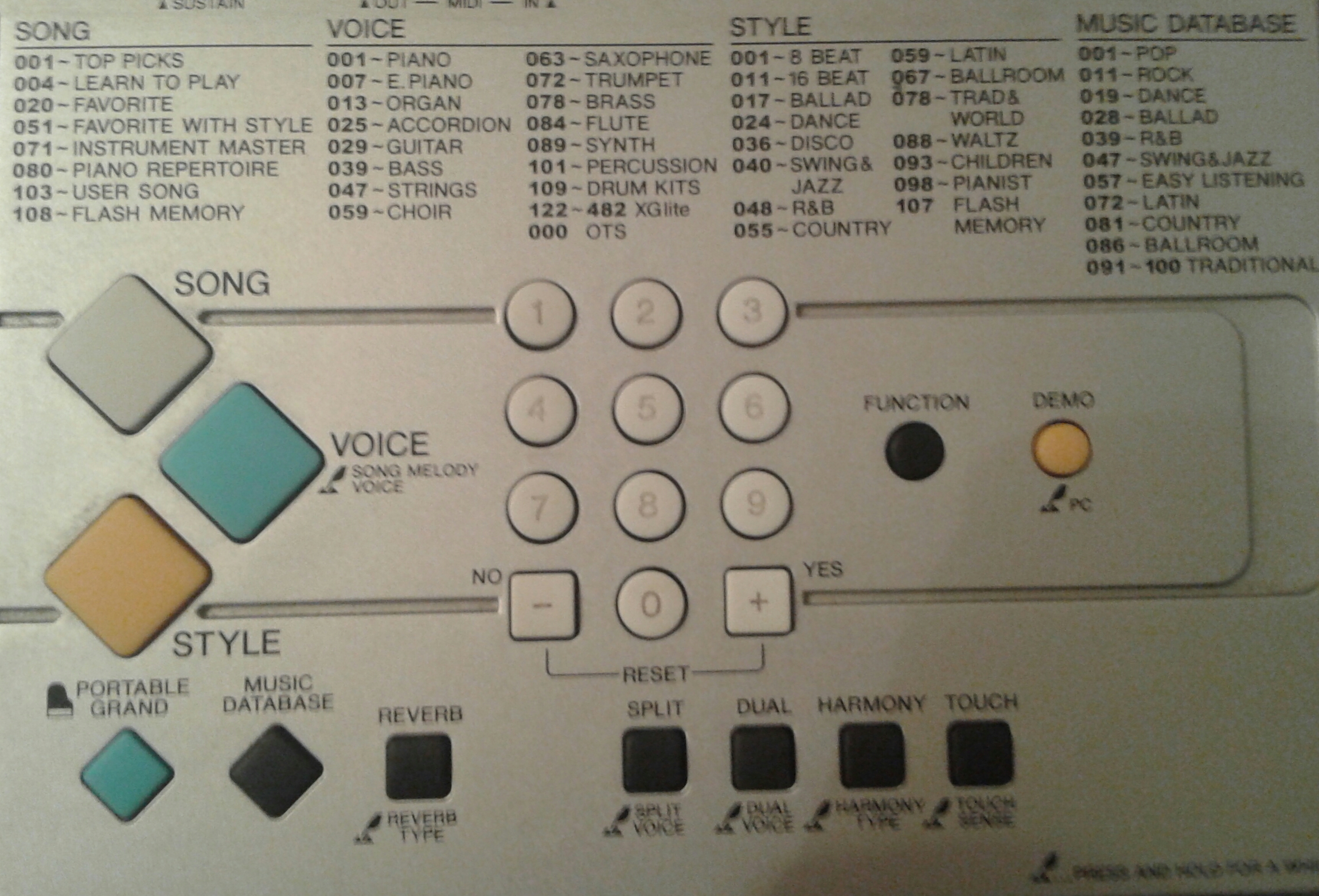
Right corps with voice, songs, style

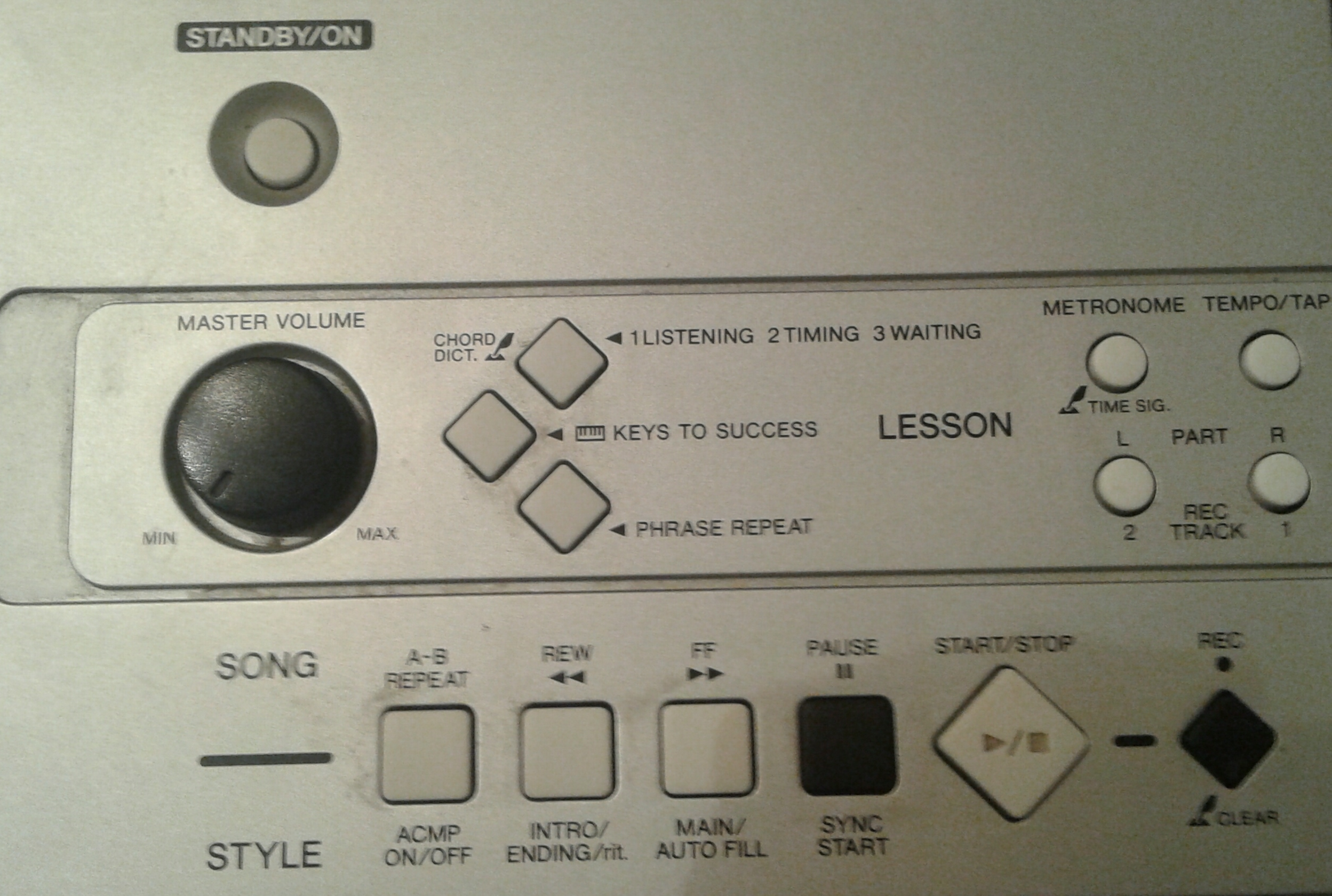
Left features with metronome, stand by button, recording button, etc.
Yamaha PSR-E323

== See also ==
- Yamaha DX7
- Yamaha products
