= Roland JP-8000 =

Synthesizer introduced in 1996

JP-8000
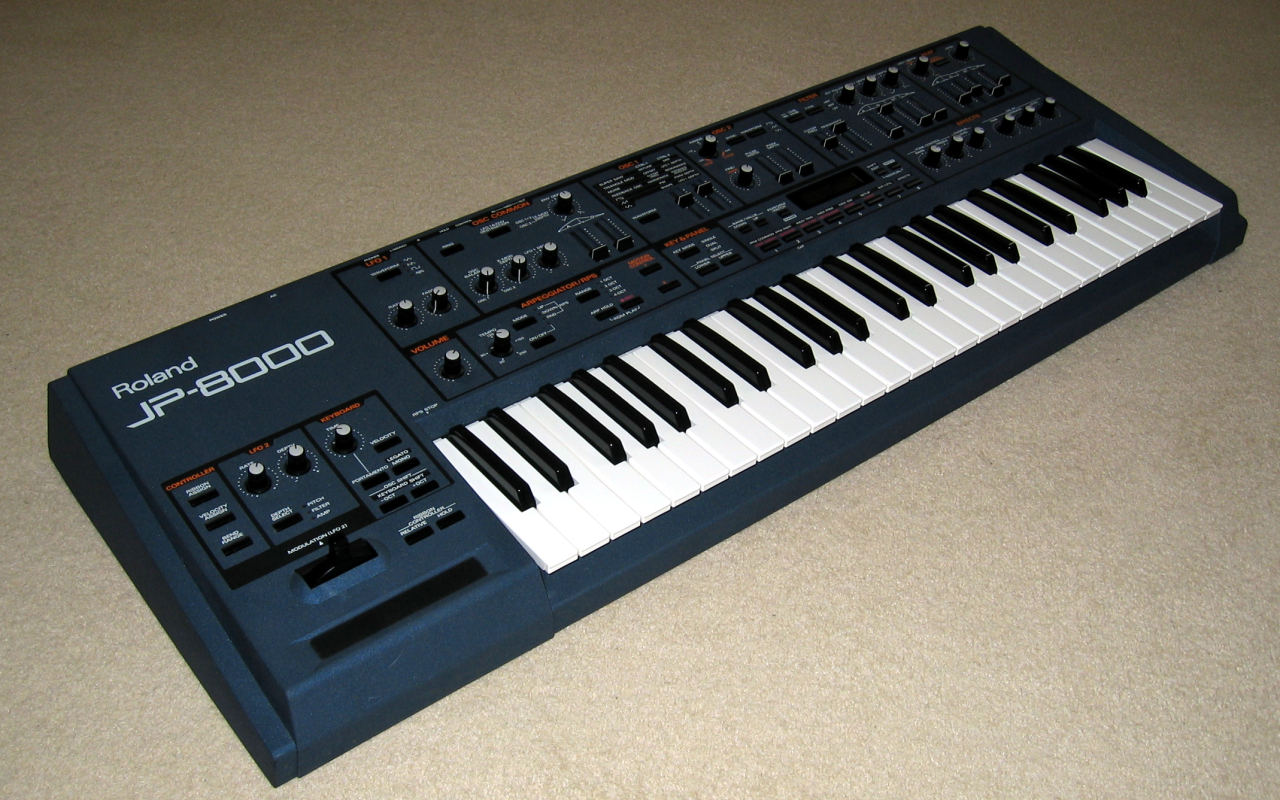
- Manufacturer: Roland
- Dates: 1996 - 2001
- Price: $2,295 USD

Technical specifications
- Polyphony: 8 voices
- Timbrality: 2
- Oscillator: 2 oscillators per voice / sync OSC1 types : Super Saw / Triangle mod / noise / Feedback / Square / Saw / Triangle. OSC2 types : Square / Saw / Triangle
- LFO: 2 sawtooth/square/triangle
- Synthesis type: Virtual analog Subtractive
- Filter: 1 12dB / 24dB resonant lowpass/highpass/bandpass
- Attenuator: 2 ADSR
- Aftertouch expression: No
- Velocity expression: Yes
- Storage memory: 128 presets/128 user patches 64 preset performances/64 user performances
- Effects: Chorus, delay, 2 band EQ / ring modulator

Input/output
- Keyboard: 49 keys
- External control: MIDI

The Roland JP-8000 is an analog modeling synthesizer released by the Roland Corporation in 1996.

== Overview ==
The Roland JP-8000 was released in early 1997 as part of the first wave of virtual analog modeling synthesizers (VA synths). Others from that period included the Clavia Nord Lead (1995), Korg Prophecy (1995), Access Virus (1997) and Yamaha AN1x (1997). VA synths had the goal of recreating the sound, functionality and user interface of classic analog synthesizers. The JP-8000 was viewed at the time as the modern digital incarnation of the classic Roland Jupiter-8, from 1981. The programming interface, synthesis options and general tone is very similar to Roland's Jupiter-6 as well. The JP-8000 sought to digitally reproduce the analog tonalities and power of its analog predecessors. Although it lacked somewhat in analog warmth due to its early digital architecture, it added many new features, such as RPS (Realtime Phrase Sequencing), which allowed short sequenced phrases to be assigned to keys, and such as motion control. It also featured the unique Supersaw oscillators and analog-style controllers such as an arpeggiator and an assignable touch response ribbon control.

The JP-8000 had several features that differed from other analog modeling synthesizers of the time: most notably, Roland's unique oscillator types ("Feedback" and "Supersaw") and the use of sliders instead of rotary encoders (knobs) to edit patch parameters. The Supersaw in particular was the reason why the JP-8000 was particularly successful as a main keyboard (along with the Virus) in the dance music market, especially for trance music. Just like what the Roland TB-303 had done for acid house and acid techno, the JP-8000's Supersaw leads became characteristic of a certain type of trance music that can be roughly called "Anthem Trance", where a melodic, powerful lead based on a Supersaw patch provided the hook and melody throughout the song. The sound processor is 16-bit.

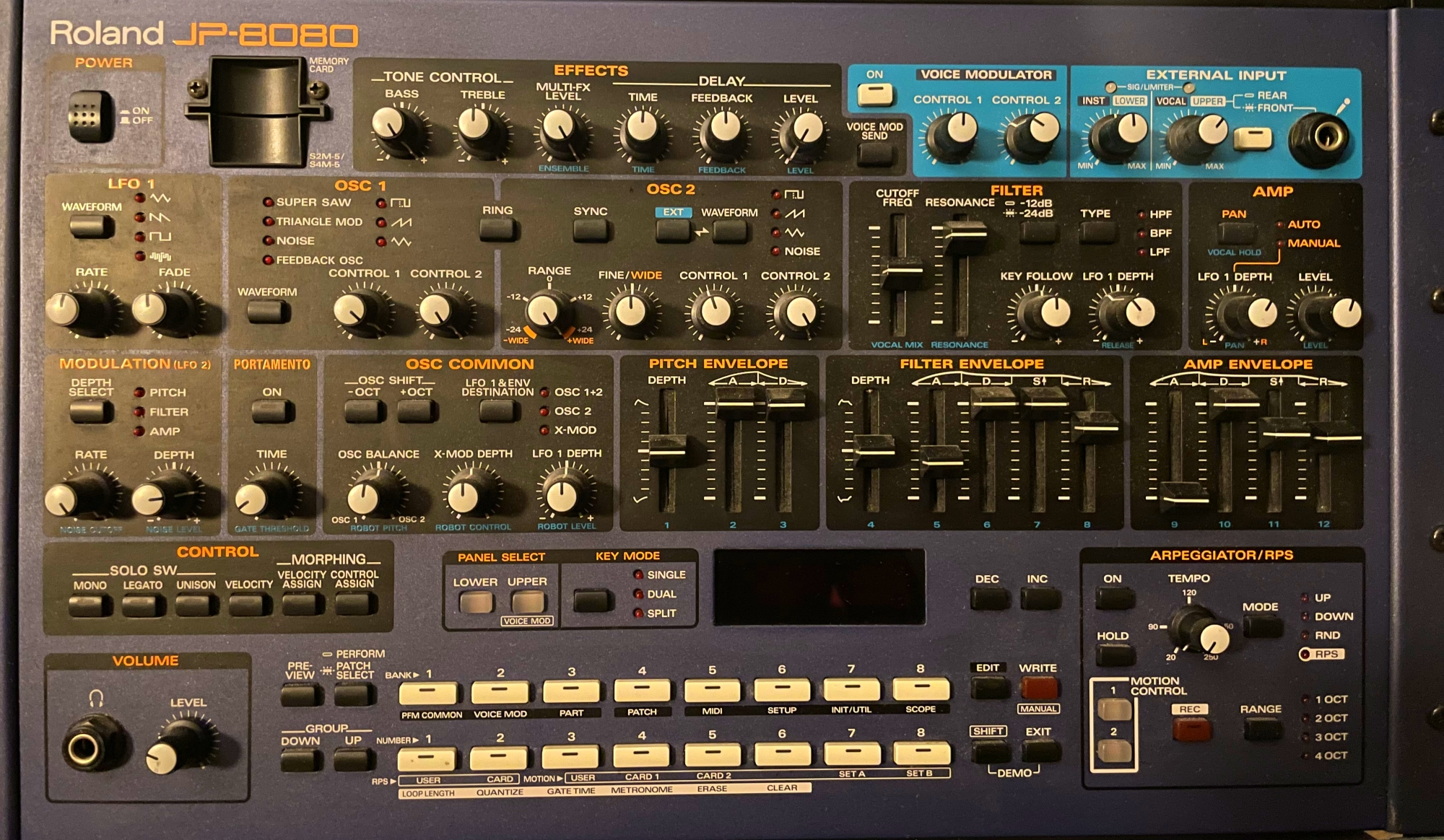
Roland JP-8080

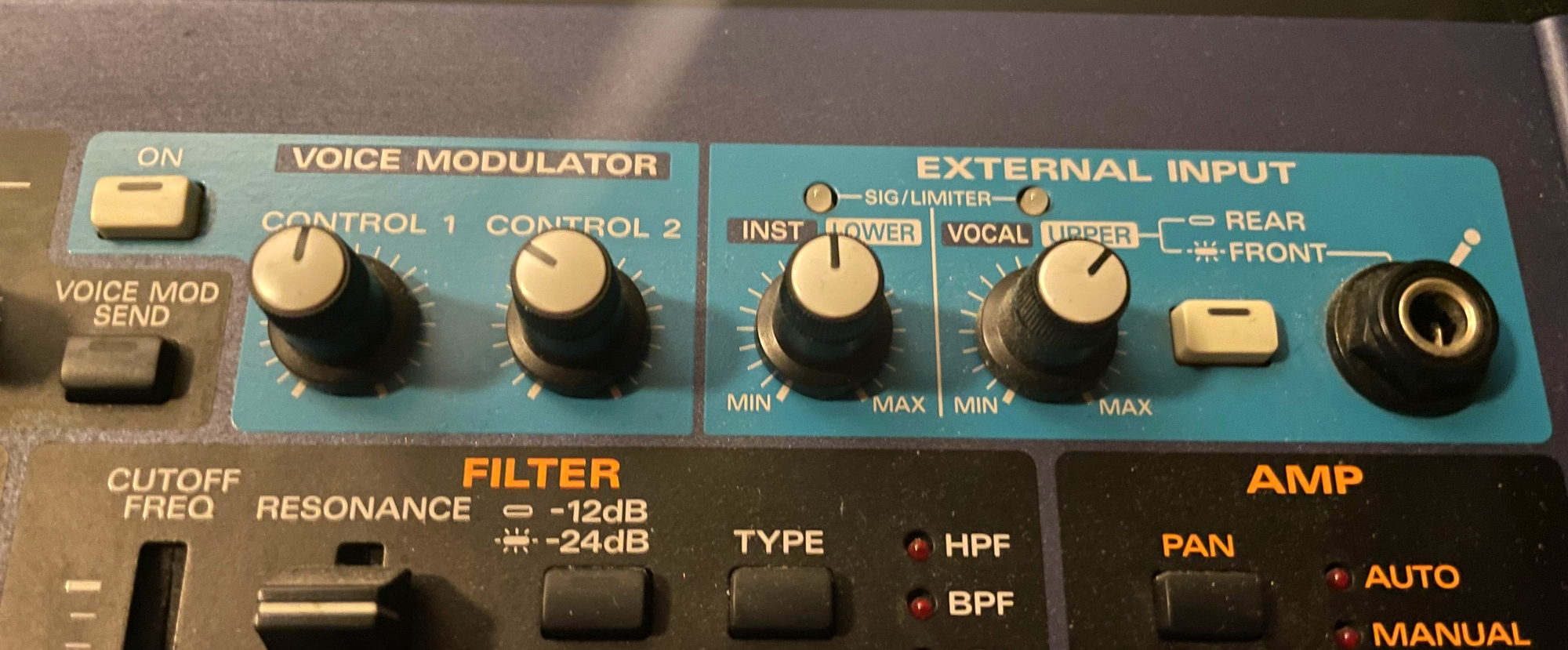
The 'modulator' section exclusive to the JP-8080

In 1998, Roland released a 6U, 19" rack version of JP-8000 called the JP-8080. The JP-8080 combined the analog modeling sound engine of the JP-8000 with additional features such as an internal vocoder. The JP-8080 also had three times the number of patches and performances, an additional Noise waveform on Osc 2 and a distortion effect. Due to these changes all JP-8000 patches are compatible with the JP-8080 but not all JP-8080 patches are compatible with the JP-8000.

The JP-8080 is prominent on the Darude single Sandstorm. The song is named for the pad patch loaded on boot up of JP-8080.

== Supersaw ==
The supersaw is a waveform created by Roland for its JP-8000 and JP-8080 line of analog modeling synthesizers. It emulates the sound of multiple detuned sawtooth oscillators. The waveform is described as a free-run oscillator whose shape resembles 7 sawtooth oscillators detuned against each other over a period of time. The Supersaw became a genre-defining aspect of trance and hardcore. The Supersaw and supersaw-inspired copies eventually found their way into many early 21st century electronic dance music genres as well as the pop-charts via electronic dance music remixes of pop songs.

A simple arpeggiated "Super Saw" waveform pattern from the JP-8000, demonstrating its typical usage in trance music

Since production of the JP-8000 ceased, several companies have incorporated "supersaw-like" oscillator algorithms into their hardware and software synthesizers. SUPERWAVE P8 is an example of a software synthesizer inspired by the architecture of the JP-8000, with its multiple sawtooth oscillators. Another is the Supersaw Plus, which has a JP-8000-style interface and a variation on the supersaw waveform that provides 2, 4, 6 or 10 oscillators. In 2005, Access Music released the TI-line of synthesizers, which feature an oscillator type called Hypersaw that is similar to Roland's supersaw oscillator. Roland also continues to produce other synthesizers, such as the SH-201, the SH-01, the Roland V-Synth, the Roland V-Synth XT , the Roland Gaia 2 that have the supersaw oscillator type.
