= QY =

QY or qy may refer to:

- ABC Far North, a radio station (former call letters 4QY)
- European Air Transport Leipzig and European Air Transport, airlines sharing IATA code QY
- Quay, on maps
- Yamaha QY10, a hand-held music workstation
