= Walkstation =

Portable audio workstation

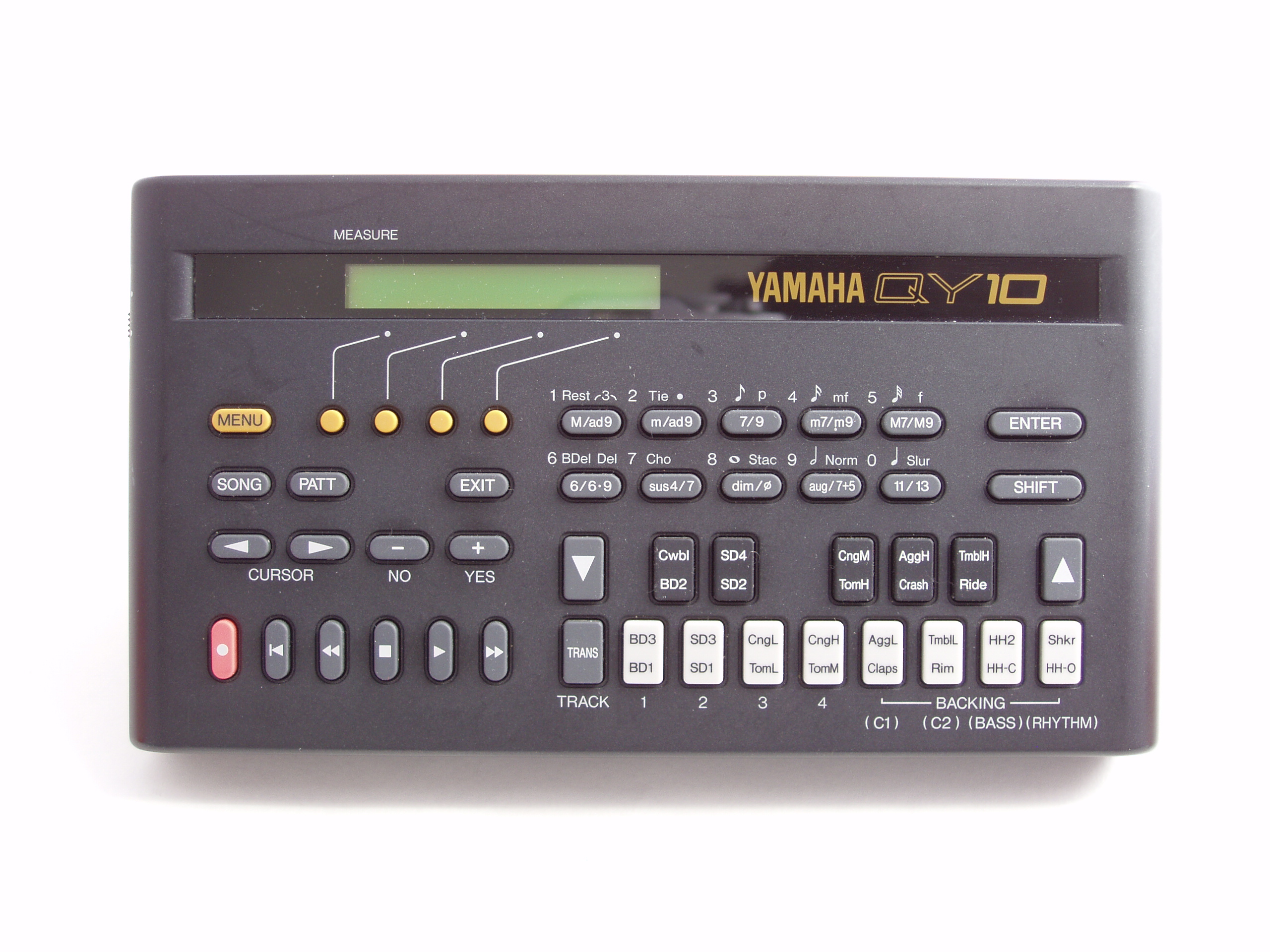
The Yamaha QY10 - the device for which the term walkstation was originally coined

A walkstation is an electronic music device which provides musicians with the facilities of a music workstation in a portable package. The term was introduced as part of the marketing for the Yamaha QY10, presumably as a portmanteau of Walkman and workstation. Its usage is typically limited to the portable members of Yamaha's QY sequencer family.

The features of a walkstation are:

- sound module
- music sequencer
- (usually) a small musical keyboard.
- small size
- battery power

The heyday of the walkstation lay between the time when creating such devices was viable and the time when general-purpose portable devices, such as laptops and mobile phones, were capable of offering comparable functionality.

== Devices ==
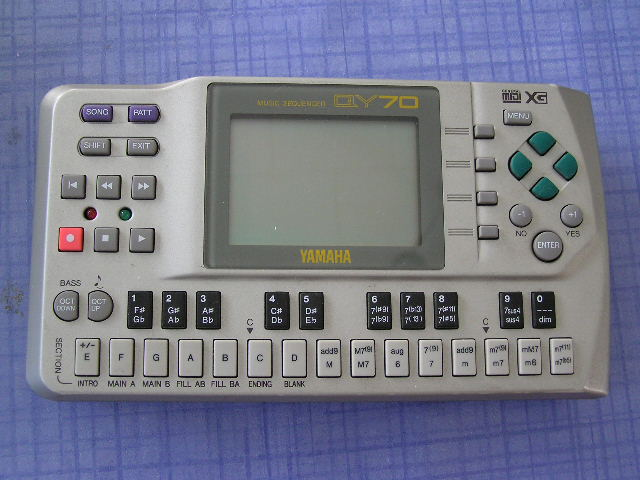
Yamaha QY70

Manufacturer	Device	Year	MIDI	Keyboard	Sequencer tracks	Accompaniment tracks	User accompaniment	Digital effects	Storage media
Yamaha	QY10	1990	Yes	1 octave	4	4	Yes	No	No
Yamaha	QY20	1992	Yes	2 octaves	4	4	Yes	No	No
Yamaha	QY8	1994	Yes	None	4	4	No	No	No
Yamaha	QY22	1995	GM	2 octaves	4	4	Yes	No	No
Yamaha	QY70	1997	GM/XG	2 octaves	16	8	Yes	Yes	No
Yamaha	QY100	2000	GM/XG	2 octaves	16	8	Yes	Yes	SmartMedia

Other comparable devices:

Manufacturer	Device	Year	MIDI	Keyboard	Sequencer tracks	Accompaniment tracks	User accompaniment	Digital effects	Storage media
Philips	PMC-100	1986	No	2 octaves	1	5	No	No	Cassette tape
Boss	Dr 5	1993	Yes	Fretboard Style	0	4	Yes	No	No
Roland	PMA-5	1996	GM/GS	2 octaves	4	4	Yes	Yes	No

More recent portable music workstations include:

- Teenage Engineering OP-1
- Cyberstep KDJ-ONE
