= Yamaha CS1x =

Sample-based synthesizer made by the Yamaha Corporation

CS1x
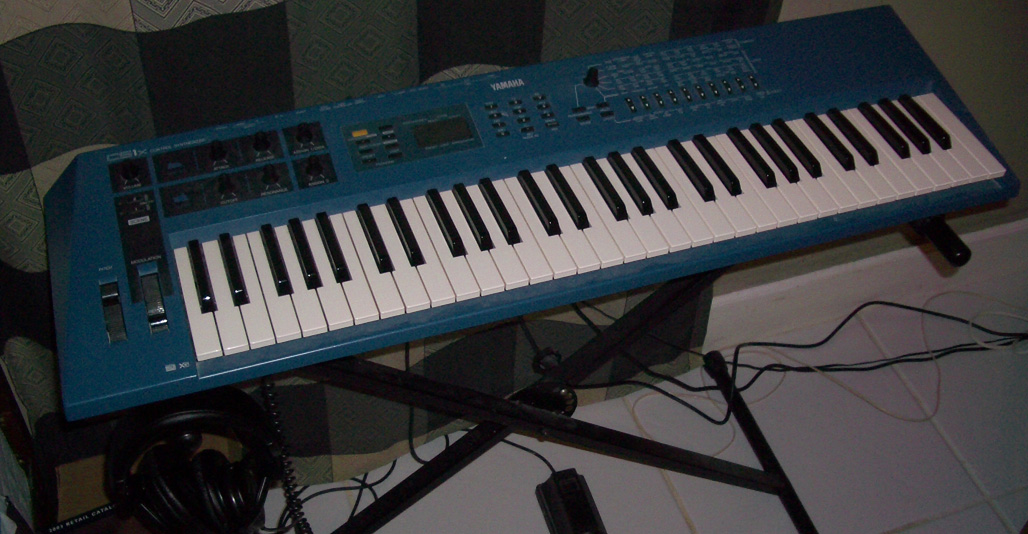
- Manufacturer: Yamaha Corporation
- Dates: 1996 – 1999
- Price: £599

Technical specifications
- Polyphony: 32 voices
- Oscillator: XG format
- LFO: Yes
- Synthesis type: wavetable / sample-based synthesis
- Filter: Low-pass filter
- Attenuator: Attack and release
- Aftertouch expression: No
- Velocity expression: Yes
- Storage memory: 128 preset, 128 programmable
- Effects: Reverb, chorus, variation

Input/output
- Keyboard: 61 keys
- Left-hand control: Pitch bend and mod wheel
- External control: MIDI, computer interface

The Yamaha CS1x is a sample-based synthesizer piano released by the Yamaha Corporation in 1996. Aimed primarily at dance musicians, the CS1x features analogue synthesizer-style rotary controllers and monotimbral synth voices.
The CS1x was succeeded in 1999 by the CS2x synthesizer.

== Features ==
The CS1x uses the Yamaha Sample and Synthesis technology, as well as General MIDI and XG voices from the MU-50 module.

The CS1x employs various arpeggiator presets and effects such as reverb, chorus (including flanging and celeste) and "variation" (a combination of reverbs, delays, modulation effects and equalisation).

== Sequencer ==
The Yamaha CS1x can be expanded with a small sequencer workstation module. The CS1x, CS2x and AN1x synthesizers all have a small lip on the right hand end of the front panel to accommodate a QY or SU sized module.
