= Yamaha QY10 =

Hand-held music workstation

The Yamaha QY10 is a hand-held music workstation produced by the Yamaha Corporation in the early 1990s. Possessing a MIDI sequencer, a tone generator and a tiny single-octave keyboard, the portable and battery-powered QY10 enables a musician to compose music while traveling.

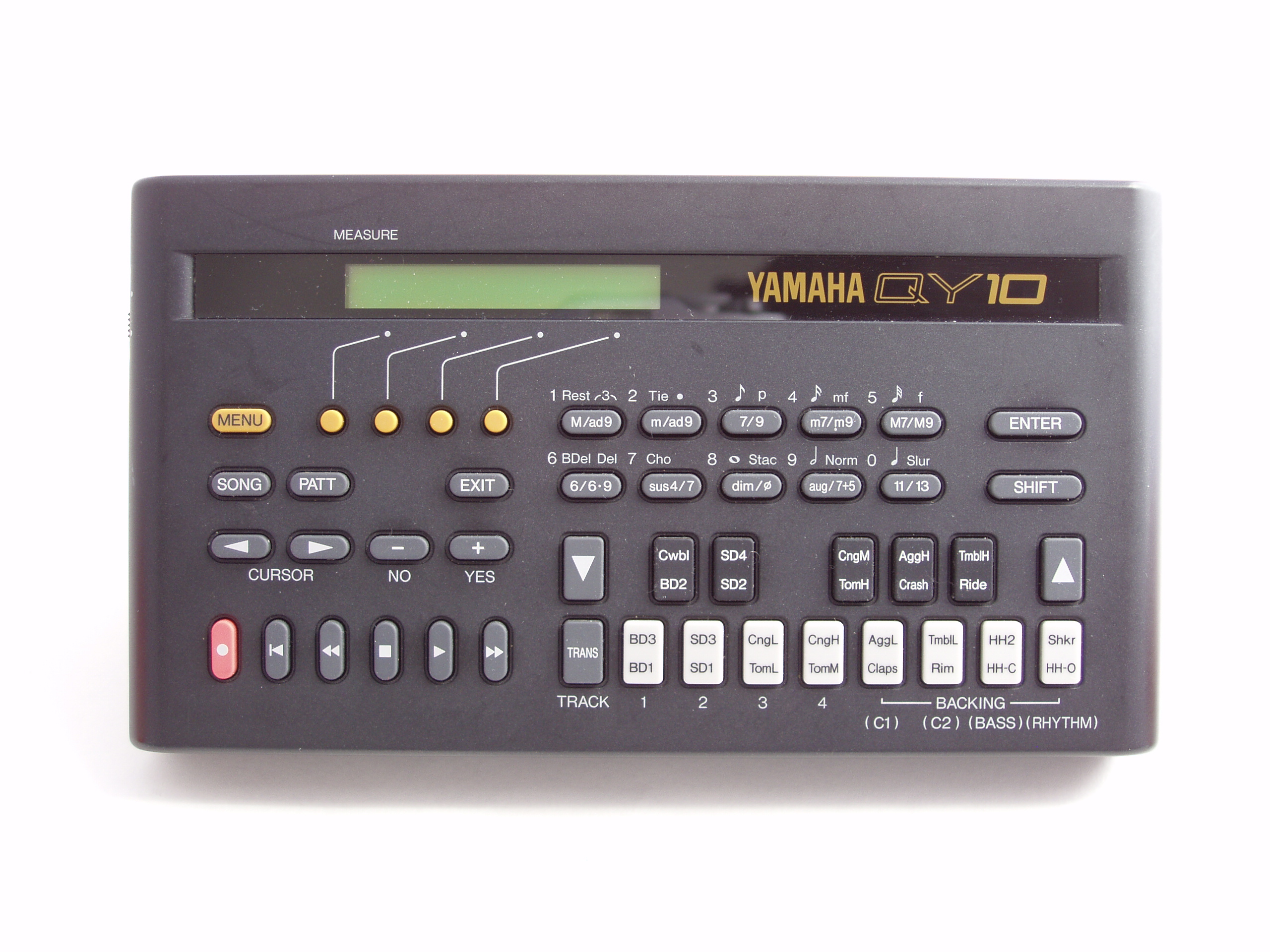
The Yamaha QY10

== History ==
Released by Yamaha in 1990, the QY10 was the first device offering the facilities of a music workstation in a portable package. In response to its design, the music technology press coined the term "walkstation", a portmanteau of the words "Walkman" and "workstation". The QY10 sold well, indicating that there was a market for these devices, so Yamaha followed it up in 1992 with the more powerful QY20 and QY22. Subsequently, both Yamaha (most Yamaha QY sequencers) and Roland (the Roland PMA-5) have produced walkstations, although neither officially use the term for their products.

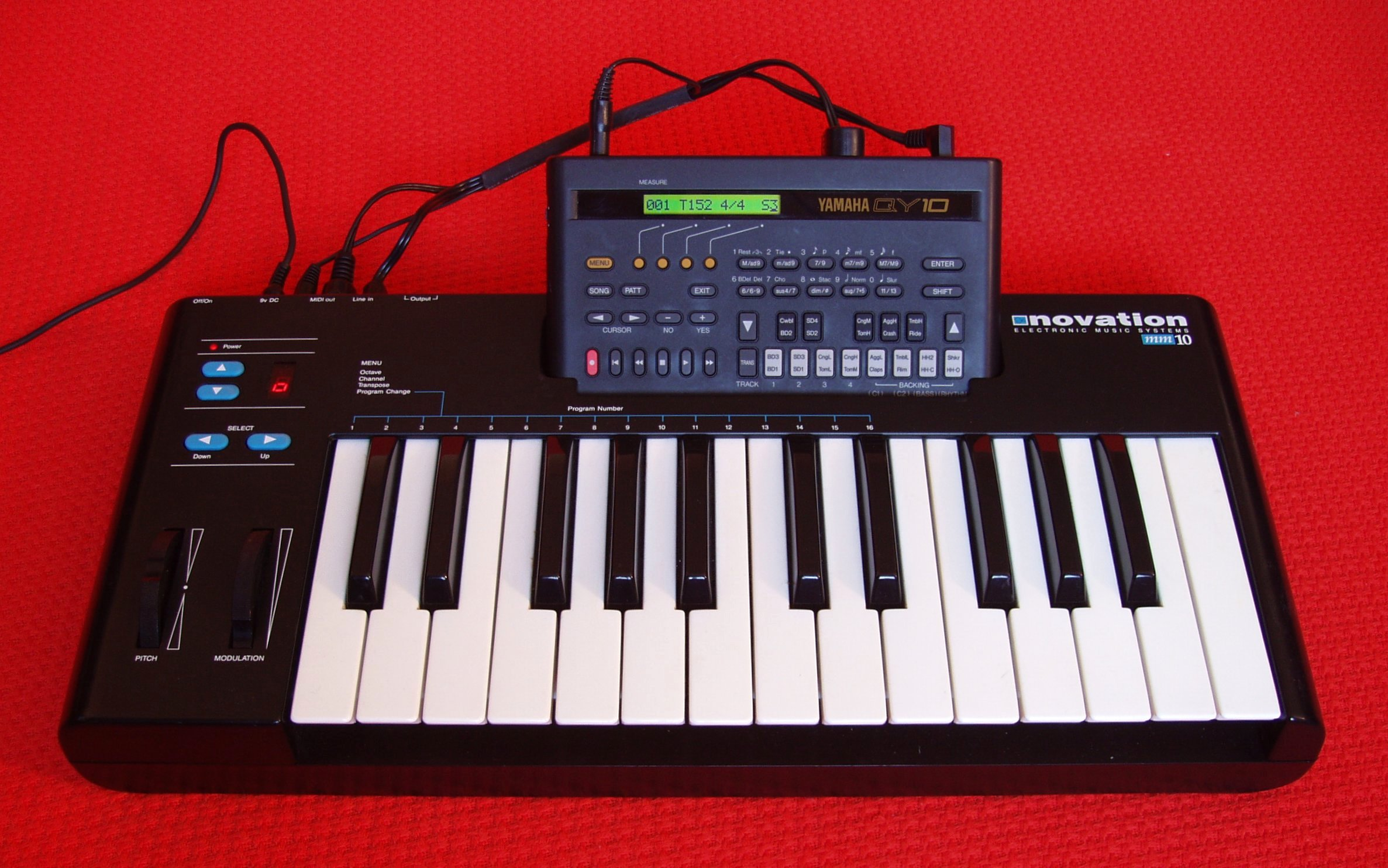
A QY10 'docked' with a Novation MM10

In 1992, Novation took advantage of the QY10's success by releasing a companion keyboard, the Novation MM10. The top of the keyboard has a slot which securely accommodates a QY10, and short cables connect the two units together. With two octaves of full-size velocity-sensitive keys, the MM10 overcomes a significant limitation of the QY10: its lack of a proper keyboard. Combined, they constitute a complete, if basic, music workstation.

During the 1990s, electronic musical equipment became more dependent on large and sophisticated graphical displays. However, the QY10's display is a small LCD panel which accommodates only 16 characters of text. This made it feasible for the Kentucky LCD Interface Project to modify the QY10 with a speech interface as an assistive technology for the blind.

The QY10 was discontinued in the mid-1990s.

== Sequencer ==
The main feature of the QY10 is its eight-track sequencer. With its "pattern"-based design, it was more suited to supporting songwriting rather than creating full musical compositions.

A pattern is a short sequence of backing music played on bass guitar, percussion and two other instruments. Patterns for various musical styles are built into the QY10, such as European house music, rhythm and blues and bossa nova. Users may also write their own patterns, which must be written in the key of C major. When playing a song, the QY10 automatically rescales patterns to match a selected chord.

The eight tracks of the sequencer are thus divided into two groups: four standard sequencer tracks and four tracks dedicated to pattern playback. The latter are typically programmed as one "backing track" which stores a sequence of pattern numbers and chord changes.

The QY10's sequencer data is maintained by an internal back-up battery, but it may also be stored externally by transferring it to a suitable device, such as a MIDI equipped computer.

== Tone Generator ==
The QY10's tone generator is a sample-based synthesizer using Yamaha's 12-bit Advanced Wave Memory synthesis technology. The tone generator is eight part multi-timbral (i.e., eight instruments may sound at once) and 28-note polyphonic (i.e., 28 notes may sound at once), which provides adequate support for sequences written on the unit. In other respects, however, the tone generator is quite limited. Only 30 instruments and one drum kit with 26 sounds are available. Furthermore, instruments must be either centered or panned completely left or right. These limitations can be understood in the context of the QY10's primary role as a composition tool, rather than as a musical instrument.

== Applications ==
Although the primary use of the QY10 is as a portable composing tool, it has other applications.

With its pattern-based sequencing system, it is particularly suited for use as an accompaniment device. However, unlike other sequencers in the QY series, the QY10 cannot auto-harmonize its backing tracks to chords played on an external MIDI keyboard.

Another application is as a general-purpose MIDI sequencer, controlling instruments with far superior sounds than those available from its own tone generator. However, for this use, it has several disadvantages, including fixed MIDI channel assignments and limited support for MIDI control information. The pattern-based design of its sequencer might also be considered a disadvantage in this context.

== Legacy ==
The QY10's legacy is the introduction of the walkstation and the QY sequencer. It has also influenced the physical design of many of Yamaha's subsequent devices, for example the MU5 sound module, the RY8 drum machine and the SU10 sampler. The CS1x, CS2x and AN1x have a small lip on the right hand end of the keyboard to accommodate a QY or SU-sized module.
