= Stab (music) =

Single staccato note or chord

A single horn stab

In music, a stab is a single staccato note or chord that adds dramatic punctuation to a composition. Stabs may be provided by horns (real or synthesized)—a horn stab—or an orchestral sample—an orchestra hit—and usually occur on a 1-beat. Stabs are used in a wide variety of music genres including jazz, rock, classical, funk, freestyle, trap, EDM, metal and ska.

There is no standardized notation symbol to specifically indicate a stab. They are most commonly notated as a short note value with a staccato dot, sometimes with the verbal marking "stab".

There's a rule of thumb in funk music that says short sounds are better than long: thus the drier the guitar hit, the tighter the horn stab, the slappier the bass, the more clipped the clavinet etc, the better. It's the bits of silence in-between these short events that builds anticipation for the next one - the tension/release principle in rhythmic form.

— Steve Lodder

Stabs are also used in electronic music in the form of very short snippets of a song used as rhythmic accents in a new composition. Early breakbeat hardcore, such as The Prodigy's "Fire", and hip hop in general made use of stabs.

== See also ==
- Orchestra hit
- Punch (music)
- Sforzando, the equivalent in classical music
