= Yamaha AN1x =

Synthesizer introduced in 1997

AN1x
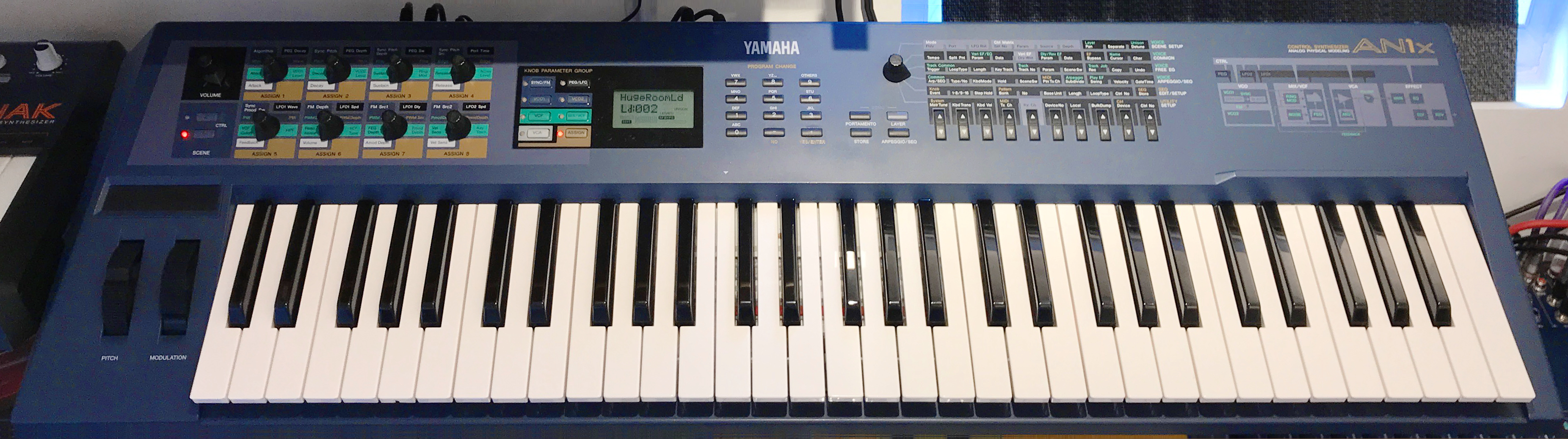
- AN1x Virtual Analog Synthesizer
- Manufacturer: Yamaha
- Dates: 1997 - 1998
- Price: £899 (1997) $1495

Technical specifications
- Polyphony: 10 notes
- Timbrality: 2× voices (Scenes 1 & 2)
- Oscillator: 2× oscillators per voice: square/ sawtooth/ pulse width/ ring modulation/ noise/ FM/ variable wave-shapes (Edge - sine/triangle)/ Saw2/ Inner1-3/ slave(sub) osc on osc1
- LFO: 2× low frequency oscillators per voice: sine/ sawtooth/ square/ triangle/ s&h/ mix (21× waveforms)
- Synthesis type: Virtual analog Subtractive
- Filter: 1× resonant multi-mode & 1× high-pass
- Attenuator: 2× ADSR envelopes
- Aftertouch expression: Yes, channel
- Velocity expression: Yes
- Storage memory: 128 patches (256 Scenes)
- Effects: Reverb, delay, EQ, chorus, flanger, symphonic, phaser, auto pan, rotary speaker, pitch change, aural exciter, compressor, wah, distortion, overdrive, amp simulator

Input/output
- Keyboard: 61 keys, portamento, split
- Left-hand control: Pitch bend, modulation wheel, ribbon controller, 8× realtime controls
- External control: MIDI

The Yamaha AN1x is a DSP-based analog modeling synthesizer (a.k.a. virtual analog synthesizer), produced by Yamaha Corporation from 1997 to 1998, and was marketed as an "analog physical modelling control synthesizer".

== Development ==
The AN1x is Yamaha's first virtual analogue physical modelling synthesizer. After the Korg Prophecy and Clavia Nord Lead were both released in 1995, Roland followed suit in 1996 with the JP-8000. Yamaha, having already been working on physical modelling synthesis for a number of years, released the AN1x in mid-1997.

Whilst the AN1x has a similar chassis to other Yamaha synthesizers, such as the CS1x and particularly the CS2x, this is where the similarity ends. The latter use pre-loaded sample-based synthesis to generate sound, thus categorising them as romplers. The AN1x on the other hand is a fully fledged synthesizer. Yamaha's proprietary 'virtual analog' technology, models the components that traditionally occupy the signal path of an analog subtractive synthesizer. The VCOs, VCAs, VCFs, and LFOs etc., are all digitally modelled and rendered using DSP VLSI processor(s).

It has been noted that the firmware of the AN1x contains simulated characteristics of Sequential Circuits' Prophet 5 and particularly the Prophet 10 synthesizers, as well as Yamaha's own CS range of polyphonic analog synthesisers. Yamaha purchased the rights to Sequential Circuits in 1987, following the dissolution of the company. Sequential's founder, Dave Smith subsequently became President of DSD Inc., a research and development division of Yamaha. During his time at Yamaha, in addition to his work on vector and wavetable synthesis, which culminated in the SY22 and TG33, Smith also worked on physical modelling synthesis and software synthesizer concepts.

== Scenes and voice architecture ==
The AN1x is a duo-timbral synthesizer, having two individual sets of voice parameters, called Scenes, for each of the 128 voice patches. Within each voice, each scene can be programmed to be similar sounding variations of each other, two identical copies of the same sound, or even two completely different sounding timbres.

The user can either quickly switch between the two Scenes, or morph between them, which interpolates individual parameters, rather than simply crossfading. The result being complex new timbres being heard whilst morphing. It is also possible to save a snapshot of the timbre at any point during a morph, to become a new baseline timbre for one of the Scenes. Additionally, Scene data can be copied from, or saved to a different voice patch entirely. When the AN1x's Layer mode is set to either Split/Split Unison or Dual/Dual Unison, dual timbrality is possible, whereby Scenes can be set to receive MIDI data on two separate channels. Each Scene will have five notes of polyphony. The AN1x has a maximum polyphony of ten notes, although the actual polyphony depends upon the playing mode the synthesizer is set to. These being either a single monotimbral Scene, two Scenes layered or split, monophonic or polyphonic, and whether the note-multiplying Unison mode is active. Dual mode halves polyphony to five notes per voice, dividing each of the two internal 5-note DSP processors between both Scenes separately; dual timbral. In mono or dual modes, Unison uses five notes per key per Scene for a single voice (1 processor × 5 notes), or two notes per key for a dual voice (2 processors × 1 timbre per processor); thus, in Dual, Mono or Unison mode, the synthesizer is monophonic for each of the two Scenes. In polyphonic mode, Unison is only possible for single voices, each key takes two notes, of the same timbre, one from each of the two processors.

== Waveform oscillators ==
The voice architecture is based on a dual oscillator design with multi-mode filter. Available waveforms are: Pulse-width modulation (PWM), Saw, Square, Saw2, Saw/Pulse Wave mix, and Saw/Square mix. Additional waves, Inner 1-3 are available for the first oscillator (OSC1) in oscillator sync mode. Triangle and sine waves are possible by altering the shape of pulse waves. The AN1x has a wave shaping Edge tool, which can facilitate 128 intermediate waves. The first oscillator can be split to have a master, main and a tuneable slave sub-oscillator, when activated via three oscillator sync algorithms. The master and/or slave oscillator within OSC1 can be modulated by the first low-frequency oscillator (LFO1), either jointly or individually. The AN1x has twin operator frequency modulation (FM), comprising four algorithms, where the first oscillator is modulated by the second. Finally there is ring modulation and white noise. When set to Unison mode, the AN1x layers five oscillators for each Scene timbre. Whilst this reduces polyphony, Unison thickens up the sound considerably. Additionally, stereo separation can be set for panning, as well as the tuning of the five layered oscillators. The overall effect is not too dissimilar from the Roland JP-8000 supersaw waveform, except that Unison can be applied to waveforms other than the sawtooth wave.

== Filters, envelopes, low frequency oscillators and control matrix ==
Each of the two scenes that make up a single voice is composed of an amplitude envelope, a filter envelope, a pitch envelope, and a three-band equaliser. These affect the combined two oscillators on a per-note basis. The AN1x has two LFOs. LFO1 comprises 21 waveforms: 5× sine variations, 5× triangle variations, 3× square variations, 4× saw variations and 4× sample and hold variations. LFO2 consists of a triangle wave only. These affect all notes at once, i.e. monophonic LFOs. The LFOs are fast, up to the audible note range. The AN1x has a non-resonant high-pass filter, which is situated in series with a multimode resonant filter, the latter offering a low-pass filter (LPF), high-pass filter (HPF), band-pass filter (BPF) and band elimination filter (BEF). The multimode filter is capable of resonant self oscillation. Additionally, feedback from the voltage controlled amplifier (VCA) is routed back to the oscillator mixer before the main filter, and frequency modulation can be used alongside oscillator sync. The AN1x has a comprehensive modulation matrix, comprising 16 sources and 96 destinations.

== Sequencing capabilities ==
The AN1x features an arpeggiator with 30 preset patterns, a step sequencer with 16 steps, 256 total sequence patterns, 128 voice patterns 'one per voice' + 128 user patterns. All 256 patterns can be overwritten for use, and a 'Free Envelope Generator' '128 user patterns, one per voice'. The arpeggiator and sequencer can both output to MIDI and sync to MIDI timecode, and the arpeggiator can also be applied to incoming MIDI data. Furthermore, the notes may be fixed or transposed via the synthesizer's keyboard or MIDI input. The step sequencer can be used to send control data, such as filter cutoff values or notes to the synthesizer's tone generator or to MIDI output. Both the arpeggiator and step sequencer have several looping modes. The 'Free Envelope Generator' (Free EG) is a powerful motion control feature that allows the user to record controller movements for up to four parameters, '4 tracks, 1 parameter per track' for a duration of up to 16 seconds each, or 8 bars that are tempo linked.

Note: If the tempo is set to 40bpm, with a 4/4 count, this would result in 48 seconds of recording time per track. When applied to a voice, the Free EG becomes an intrinsic component of the voice whilst it is played, allowing for complex and evolving organic movement of sound. The way in which the Free EG loops can also be set in various ways, as well as the keyboard tracking and triggering.

== Multi effects ==
The effects section contains three different sets of programmable effects, as well as a programmable 3-band equaliser (EQ). The 14 variation effect types are: Chorus, '2 types', flanger, symphonic, phaser, auto pan, rotary speaker, pitch change, aural exciter, compressor, wah, distortion, overdrive and amp simulator. The five delay effect types are: Delay left-centre-right (LCR), delay left-right (LR), echo, cross delay and tempo delay, which automatically matches the delay time to the current tempo setting. The eight reverb effect types include three types of hall reverb, two types each of room and stage reverb, and a plate reverb.

The voice signal initially passes through the variation and EQ sections in series, then on to the delay and reverb sections. The delay and reverb sections can be configured to operate in either series or parallel. Individual effects sections (variation, delay, reverb) or all effects, excluding the EQ, can be bypassed at will. Additionally, realtime controllers can be designated to control specific effect parameters.

== Control synthesizer ==
As well as promoting its "Analog Physical Modelling", Yamaha referred to the AN1x as a "control synthesizer", in a similar vein to the CS1x and CS2x. This is due to each voice patch in the AN1x having 20 "control sets", which utilise assignments of the user-adjustable controls and MIDI control change messages to a number of numerical parameters within the sound engine.

The user controls include: Keyboard pitch, velocity and channel aftertouch, a modulation wheel, a pressure-sensitive (X-axis,Z-axis) ribbon controller, two expression pedal input sockets, a footswitch input socket, and eight assignable parameter control knobs. The underlying philosophy of this arrangement is that the user doesn't have to alter the actual sound editing parameters whilst playing, instead using the assignable real-time controls mentioned above.

The physical keyboard action includes velocity, aftertouch, and portamento. The X-Z ribbon controller, responds to horizontal sweeps and pressure. The eight realtime control knobs can also be pressed to display their current parameter values. Each knob and controller can have multiple parameters assigned to them.

== Controller resolution ==
Being a first-generation virtual analog synthesizer, the AN1x's controller resolution responds by default to 128 increments from its built in controllers. Consequently, the user will sometimes hear slight but distinct stepping of the filter, especially when more pronounced resonance is used. However, there are several workarounds: The first is to press the control knobs while rotating them to access smoother increments, but over a narrower frequency range. The second method involves the use of a MIDI controller or synthesizer, whose controllers generate higher resolution data values. The AN1x responds to this due to its mature MIDI implementation and NRPN recognition. The result being a smoothing out of the filter sweep, therefore giving a more authentic analog feel.

== Physical characteristics ==
The keyboard's main housing is made of ABS plastic, and the chassis base is metal. There is also an internal metal subframe. Dimensions: 986 mm (38.8 in) (W) × 285 mm (11.2 in) (D) × 103 mm (4.1 in) (H). Weight: 7.5 kg (17 lb).

== Reception and usage ==
Though containing more features than its contemporaries, the control interface of the AN1x initially proved frustrating for some users, due to its programming being matrix-based rather than one control per parameter like the Roland JP-8000. To counter these early misgivings, a sound set was released by Yamaha UK, called the London sound set, which contained clones of some of the JP-8000 presets. This helped to demonstrate the sound capabilities of the AN1x.

In 2000, Yamaha used the AN1x synthesis architecture to produce the PLG150-AN plugin board for the CS6x. The following year, Yamaha followed the AN1x with the AN200, a groovebox-type desktop sound module.

The AN1x has been used by numerous artists, including: Jean Michel Jarre, Psyclon Nine, History Of Guns, Velvet Acid Christ, Nine Inch Nails, Nitin Sawhney, Phish, Igor Khoroshev of YES, Steve Hillier of Dubstar, Jacob Thiele of The Faint, 808 State, Antti Pouta of Pariisin Kevät, Above & Beyond, Jesper Anderberg of The Sounds, and Boards of Canada.
