= Roland SH-201 =

Synthesizer introduced in 2006

- Manufacturer: Roland
- Dates: June 2006–March 2010
- Price: US$699

Technical specifications
- Polyphony: 10 voices
- Timbrality: 2-part Multitimbral (upper/lower)
- Oscillator: 2 with sawtooth, square, pulse, triangle, sine, noise, feedback, supersaw + pitch envelope (AD)
- LFO: 2 triangle, sine, sawtooth, square, trapezoidal, sample & hold, random
- Synthesis type: Virtual analog subtractive
- Filter: 2 - 1 internal (LPF, HPR, BPF) -12 dB/-24 dB, 1 external (LPF, HPF, BPF, Notch) -12 dB/-24 dB
- Attenuator: 2 (ADSR)
- Aftertouch expression: No
- Velocity expression: Yes
- Storage memory: 32 preset/32 user
- Effects: Reverb, chorus, modulation delay, overdrive

Input/output
- Keyboard: 49
- External control: USB, MIDI

The Roland SH-201 is a discontinued 49 key, 10-voice polyphonic virtual analogue synthesizer introduced in 2006 by the Roland Corporation. The SH-201 was discontinued in 2010. Roland introduced its successor, the Roland SH-01 Gaia, at the 2010 NAMM Show.

== Features ==
The SH-201 is equipped with two analogue modeling oscillators (four when in Dual or Split mode), a multi-mode filter, ring modulator, and it allows routing an external audio signal into its own dedicated filter. Real-time controls feature 29 front panel knobs and sliders, assignable pitch/mod stick and Roland's infrared D-Beam controller. The synthesizer also acts as a USB audio interface for digital audio workstation recording.

The layout of filters, envelopes, oscillator types, and mix options are similar to the JP-8000. Notable differences are that the SH-201 uses different adsr envelope and filter modeling, offers more polyphony, oscillator choices, LFO routings and comes with computer software for more in-depth sound editing, patch librarian storage and DAW integration. The name SH-201 is derived from Roland's classic SH line of analog synthesizers, all of which were designed to be portable and simple to program, while the number 201 was chosen to reference the popular SH-101 which was also cased in plastic. It is also fully Windows and Mac compatible, connecting through a USB cable. MIDI and audio can be sent through the USB port.

== Notable users ==
- Hadouken!
- Abandon All Ships
- Calvin Harris (notable for the main synth hook in "I'm Not Alone")
- Disclosure
- Scissor Sisters
- Richard Barbieri
- Noisia
- Front 242
- The Neon Judgement
- Suicide Commando
- Marcus Brown (Madonna)
- Printz Board
- Scooter (Just on stage)
- Joker
- Jean Michel Jarre
- Ladytron
- Asia (band)
- Geoff Downes
- Milk Inc.
- Timbaland
- Jamie Cullum
- Kaiser Chiefs
- Walk the Moon
- Grimes
- Alan Walker (used for live performances)
