= Yamaha CS2x =

Sample-based synthesizer made by the Yamaha Corporation

CS2x
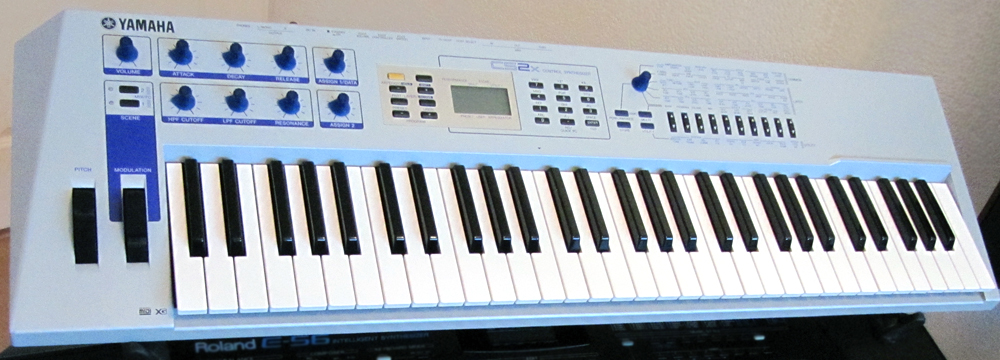
- Yamaha CS2x synthesizer
- Manufacturer: Yamaha Corporation
- Dates: 1999
- Price: £599 GBP €999 EUR

Technical specifications
- Polyphony: 64-note
- Timbrality: 16-part in Multi mode 13-part in Performance mode
- LFO: One per part/layer
- Synthesis type: Sample-based (AWM2)
- Filter: Resonant LPF, HPF
- Aftertouch expression: No
- Velocity expression: Yes
- Storage memory: 779 voices (Multi mode); 256 preset plus 256 user performances, ca. 1500 voices (Performance mode)
- Effects: Three 24-bit effect processors

Input/output
- Keyboard: 61 unweighted keys
- Left-hand control: Pitch bend and modulation wheel
- External control: MIDI in/out/thru Foot volume/control/switch Computer interface
- Audio sample: The CS2x demo songs.

The Yamaha CS2x is a sample-based synthesizer released by the Yamaha Corporation in 1999. The CS2x is designed for maximum real-time control, according to Yamaha. It is the successor of the very successful Yamaha CS1x. Enhancements include 64-note polyphony, a bigger sample ROM, a 24 dB/oct LPF/HPF filter and a two-band EQ per part/layer. The CS acronym stands for Control Synthesizer.

== Features ==
- 61 full-size non-weighted keys
- 16 MB of Wave ROM with AWM2 voices
- Multi mode: 779 voices and 30 drum kits in total
  - XG mode: 586 voices and 20 drum kits
  - TG300B mode: 614 voices and 10 drum kits
- Performance mode: 256 preset and 256 user performances, ca. 1500 material voices for performances
- Arpeggiator with 40 patterns
- 8 real-time sound control knobs
- 2 Scene memories, for morphing between sound control knob positions
- Three 24-bit effect processors (12 reverb, 14 chorus and 62 variations)
- Stereo audio input, only for mixing another sound source into the CS2x, no effects applied
- To Host serial computer interface, connecting the CS2x to a computer for sequencing purposes
- Small backlit LCD with 2 lines

The CS2x operates in two main modes: Multi and Performance. In Multi mode the CS2x can play up to 16 parts when connected to an external sequencer via MIDI. In Performance mode four of the parts are reserved as the layers of a performance, which may be played either on the keyboard or via MIDI. Performance mode allows any of the XG and the material voices to be assigned to the layers as well as to the remaining 12 parts. As opposed to the more conventional XG voices, the material voices are geared toward electronic dance music.

The CS2x also offers a TG300B (GS emulation) mode, for playing music created for Yamaha TG300B-compatible tone generators. Some of the sounds are derived from Yamaha's at-the-time flagship EX5 series. In addition, Yamaha CS1x performance dumps can be loaded to the CS2x.

The Yamaha CS2x has a silver blue or silver grey body color, in contrast to the CS1x blue body. It is immediately recognized by its remarkable left chamfered edge.

== Panel ==
The left side of the front panel has a volume knob and next to that are 8 knobs for controlling the sound parameters. There are 3 knobs for controlling the envelope settings and 3 for high and low cutoff and resonance filter settings. Also there are 2 assignable knobs. In the middle there is a numeric keypad to select a specific voice program number. On the right side there is a comprehensive edit matrix visible to control more synthesizer parameters. Turn the selector knob to select the row and adjust the corresponding parameter with the up/down buttons.

== Connections ==
The interface is handled by MIDI In, Out and Thru connections on the back of the synth. There are 3 foot control switches of which 2 are assignable. There's also a serial To Host port for direct connection to a Mac or PC. Drivers can be downloaded from the XG software page on the Yamaha website.

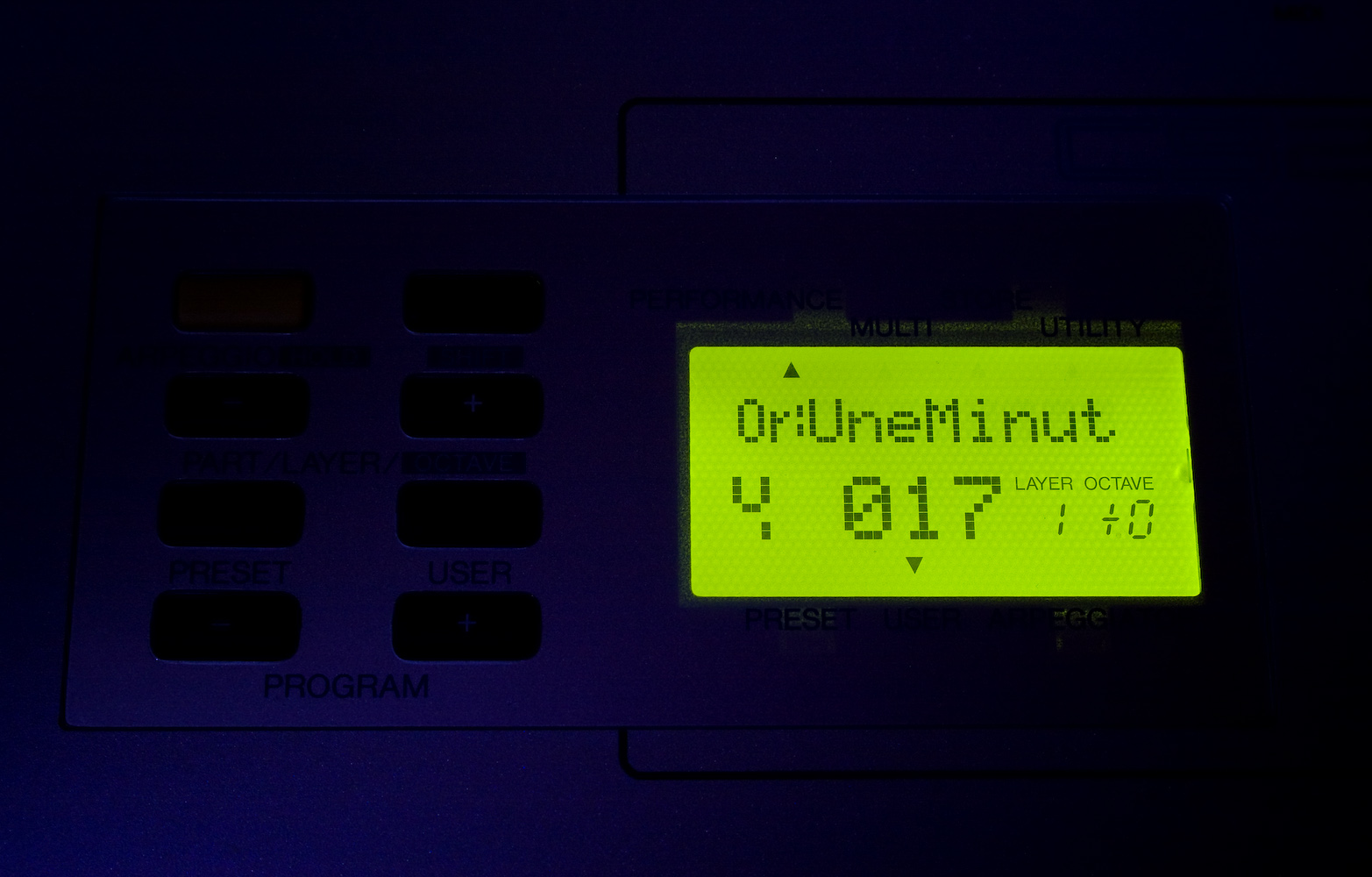
Yamaha CS2x display

== Display ==
The display of the CS2x consists of 2 lines. The top line shows the sound category, e.g. Or for Organs, Pd for Pads, and Ld for Lead sounds. After that is the name of the sound, which can be changed by the user. The second line shows P_{Ι} or P_{ΙΙ} for the preset banks, U_{Ι} or U_{ΙΙ} for the user banks. If there is an E symbol visible, this means that the current sound has been edited and needs to be stored in the memory to keep the changes that have been made. Next to that the selected sound number, and below on the right a small indication of what layer and octave is selected. Small arrows on the top and bottom of the display show what state the CS2x is in, e.g. Performance, Multi, or Utility mode.

== Accessories ==
The Yamaha CS2x can be expanded with a small sequencer workstation module. The CS1x, CS2x and AN1x synthesizers all have a small lip on the right hand end of the front panel to accommodate a QY or SU sized module. The QY70 or QY100 module in particular were most suited in both appearance and support.

Yamaha provided a Windows application for the CS2x called Tune'em uP that can be used to edit, save and load performances. It offers a GUI for modifying the various parameters, including the EQ parameters which are inaccessible from the synthesizer.
