= Roland SH-01 Gaia =

Synthesizer introduced in 2010

SH-01 Gaia
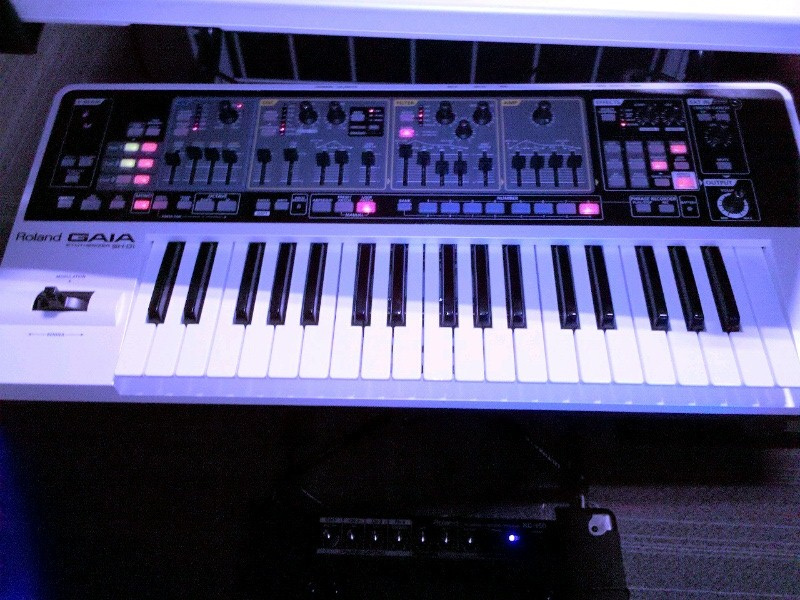
- Manufacturer: Roland Corporation
- Dates: 2010
- Price: £579 $799

Technical specifications
- Polyphony: 64 voices
- Timbrality: 16 part(1 VA, 15 PCM)
- Oscillator: 3 Saw, Square, Pulse - PWM, Triangle, Sine, Noise, Super saw
- LFO: 1 triangle, sine, saw, square, sample
- Synthesis type: Virtual analogue
- Filter: Low-pass, High-pass, band pass
- Attenuator: Attack, Decay, Envelope Depth
- Aftertouch expression: No
- Velocity expression: Yes
- Storage memory: 64 Preset, 64 User
- Effects: Distortion, flanger, delay, reverb

Input/output
- Keyboard: 37 keys
- Left-hand control: Pitch Bend/Modulation lever, D-Beam Controller
- External control: Pedal jack (TRS), MIDI (In, Out), USB, EXT IN (Stereo miniature phone type), DC IN

The SH-01 Gaia, is a sixty four voice polyphonic virtual analogue synthesizer introduced by Roland Corporation in 2010. A successor to the Gaia, named the Gaia 2, was released in September 2023.

== Architecture ==
The SH-01 Gaia is a follow-up to the popular SH-201. The lightweight unit is designed with a simple layout and no menu so you can adjust the sound parameters in real time. It has a USB interface so it can be easily connected to a computer for sequencing.

=== D-Beam ===
D Beam controller for sound manipulation. There is also a Phrase Recorder on board. The D-Beam can be controlled in real time by placing your hand over a sensor on the keyboard to control, and affects the pitch volume and can also be assigned to control another parameter for each patch.

=== Effects ===
Effects are stackable and can be combined for up to five effects to be used at the same time.

=== Power ===
The unit runs on AC power or batteries for portable use.
