= Yamaha MU-series =

Line of sound modules

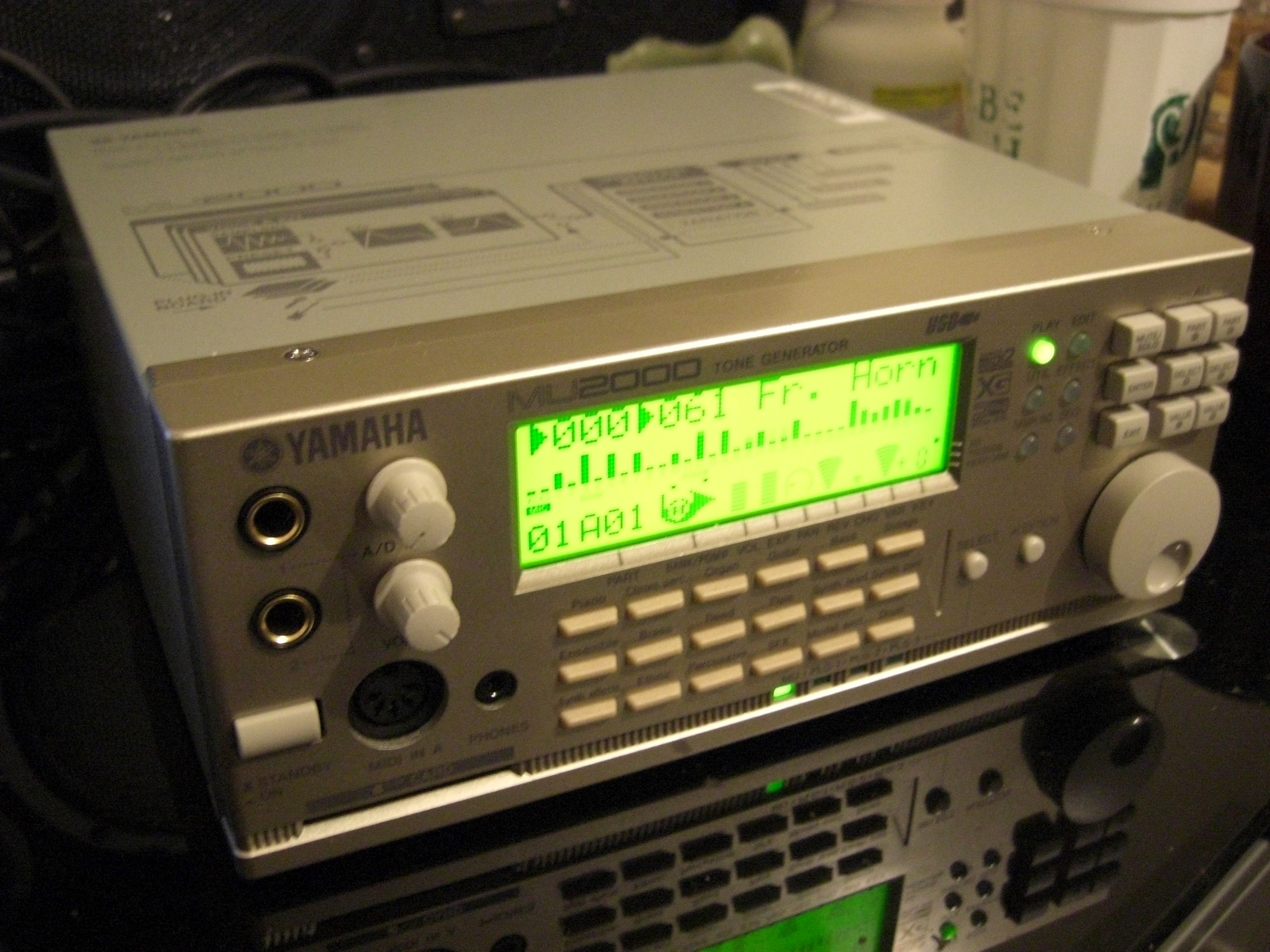
Yamaha MU2000

The Yamaha MU-series is a line of sound modules built by Yamaha. All sound modules except MU5 support Yamaha XG. The sound modules were commonly used when computers had slower processors. The computer could send MIDI commands to the sound module, acting as an external sound generation device. Later MU sound modules feature A/D inputs that allow direct input from microphones and guitars.

The MU-series product line superseded the company's previous TG-series modules, the TG100 and TG300. Although the majority of Yamaha's MU-series modules were meant for the home user, the company also made rack-mount versions of the MU90 and MU100 called the MU90R and MU100R, respectively, for professional use.

== Compatibility ==
MU50 and higher end models typically offer the following compatibility modes:

- XG mode, also used for General MIDI
- TG300B mode offers compatibility with Roland GS. In the MU1000EX and MU2000EX replaced by a licensed GS mode.
- C/M mode offers limited compatibility with the Roland MT-32 and the CM-32L.
- Yamaha Disk Orchestra Collection mode

The unit will automatically switch between XG and TG300B modes as required. C/M mode has to be enabled manually.

== List of MU-series sound modules ==
Model	Year	Standards	Parts	Polyphony	Tones	Drumsets	Notes	References
Yamaha MU5	1994	GM	16	28	128	8	General MIDI voices only, no effects. Plastic case (7" × 4" × 1.5" (19 × 10 × 3.5 cm) with LCD. To-Host serial RS232 38.4 kbit/s input as well as MIDI. RS232 from the PC to the MU5 using the to-host cable is retransmitted as MIDI by the MU5. MIDI into the MU5 is converted to RS232 38.4 kbit/s and sent out the to-host cable to the PC. Uses same tone generator as the TG100 (YMW258-F) minus effects DSP (no chorus/reverb). Unique 2MB waverom, differs from TG100.	
Yamaha MU10	1996	GM XG	16	32	676	21	A beige plastic case (7" × 4" × 1.5" (19 × 10 × 3.5 cm) with no LCD. Two AD input channels for guitar or microphone. Effects can be applied to the AD input channels. Headphone audio output that doubles as line output. To-host cable and MIDI input. Uses the SWP00 tone generator, which is also used in the MU50. Can partially load QS300 sounds. 4MB waverom (same as the MU50).	
Yamaha MU15	1998	GM XG	16	32	676	21	Visually similar to the MU5, but with full XG support. Same waverom as the MU10/MU50, but with a newer SWX00 tone generator which loses the QS300 sound support. 4MB waverom.	
Yamaha MU50	1995	GM XG	16	32	737	22	MU50 is the scaled-down version of the first XG module MU80. General MIDI, XG and supplemental voices. Effects included. AD input for guitar or microphone, but effects can not be applied to the AD input signal. Box metal chassis with backlit LCD. Uses the SWP00 tone generator, which can load QS300 sounds. 4MB waverom.	
Yamaha MU80	1994	GM XG	32	64	729	21	The first XG capable device. Effects included. AD input for guitar or microphone. Effects can be applied to the AD input signal. Box metal chassis with backlit LCD. Uses two SWP20 tone generator chips with additional support chips for DSP, EQ, wave decoding, MIDI. 8MB waverom.	
Yamaha MU90	1996	GM XG	32	64	779	30	An upgrade of MU80 featuring more instruments and drumsets. The effects subsystem is more flexible allowing for 2 selectable insert effects instead of the fixed distortion offered by the MU80. SWP30 tone generator. 8MB waverom.	
Yamaha MU90R	1996	GM XG	32	64	779	30	Rackmount version of the MU90. Adds 2 additional 'individual' outputs, and a 'data dial'.	
Yamaha MU90B	1996	GM XG	32	64	779	30	A screenless variant of the MU90, lacking any of the screen based controls.	
Yamaha MU100	1997	GM XG	32	64	1267	46	Includes PLG expansion header. SWP30 tone generator. 20MB waverom.	
Yamaha MU100R	1997	GM XG	32	64	1267	46	Rackmount version of MU100. Adds a second PLG expansion header, 2 additional 'individual' outputs, and a 'data dial'.	
Yamaha MU100B	1998	GM XG	32	64	1267	46	Screenless version. Used in the Keyboardmania games.	
Yamaha MU128	1998	GM XG	64	128	1342	47	Two AD inputs for guitar or microphone. Effects can be applied to the AD input signal. Box metal chassis with backlit LCD. SWP30B tone generator. 24MB waverom. Expandable capabilities with expansion via up to 3 Yamaha PLG expansion cards.	
Yamaha MU128 v2	1998/1999	GM XG GM2	64	128	1342	56	Firmware upgrade for the MU128. Adds General MIDI level 2 support and new effects.	
Yamaha MU1000	1999	GM XG GM2	64	128	1396	58	Cut down version of MU2000. Lacks the built-in Sampler and Sequencer on the MU2000. No SmartMedia slot. 3 PLG expansion board slots. 32MB waverom.	
Yamaha MU1000EX	1999/2000	GM GS XG GM2	64	128	1396	58	Firmware upgrade for the MU1000. Adds General MIDI level 2 support, Roland GS support, and new effects.	
Yamaha MU2000	1999	GM XG GM2	64	128	1396	58	Two AD inputs for guitar or microphone. Effects can be applied to the AD input signal. Box metal chassis with backlit LCD. Optical digital output, USB and SmartMedia card slot. Built in sampler (4 MB) and sequencer. Includes optical out port (unlike previous MU-series modules), which is also carried over to the MU500 and MU1000. 3 PLG expansion board slots. 32MB waverom.	
Yamaha MU2000EX	1999/2000	GM GS XG GM2	64	128	1396	58	Firmware upgrade for the MU2000. Adds General MIDI level 2 support, Roland GS support, and new effects.	
Yamaha MU500	2000	GM XG GM2	64	64	1396	58	LED segment display for showing MIDI activity only. USB/Serial Port/MIDI connectors. Optical output. Has the MU1000/2000 soundmap, but omits some effects and does not have A/D inputs, PLG expansion board slots, or upgradable firmware. 32MB waverom.	
