= Yamaha XG =

General MIDI extension

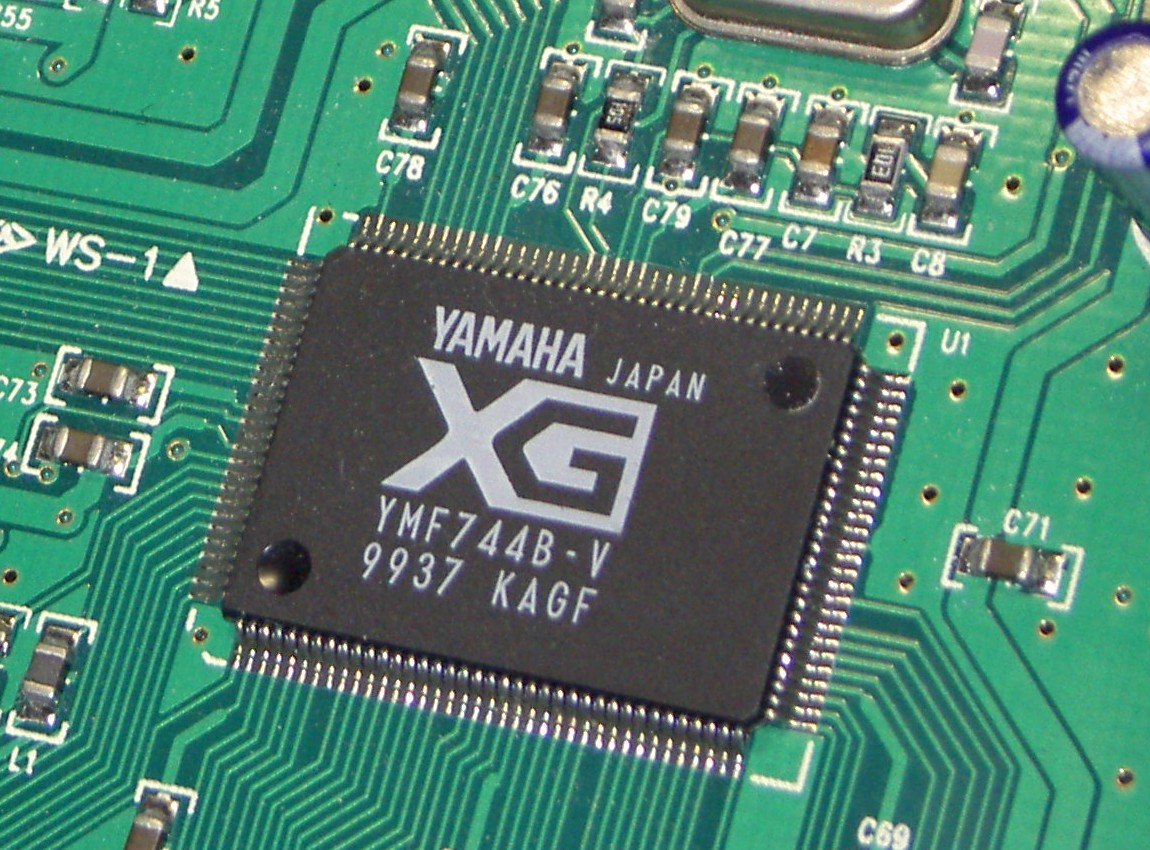
Yamaha YMF744B-V chip showcasing the XG logo

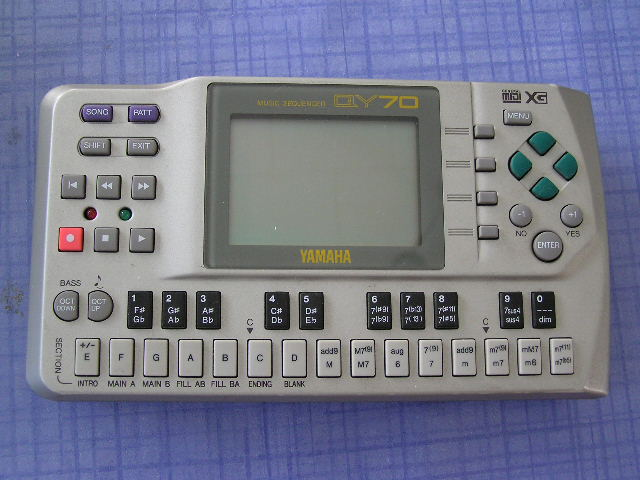
Yamaha QY70 music sequencer

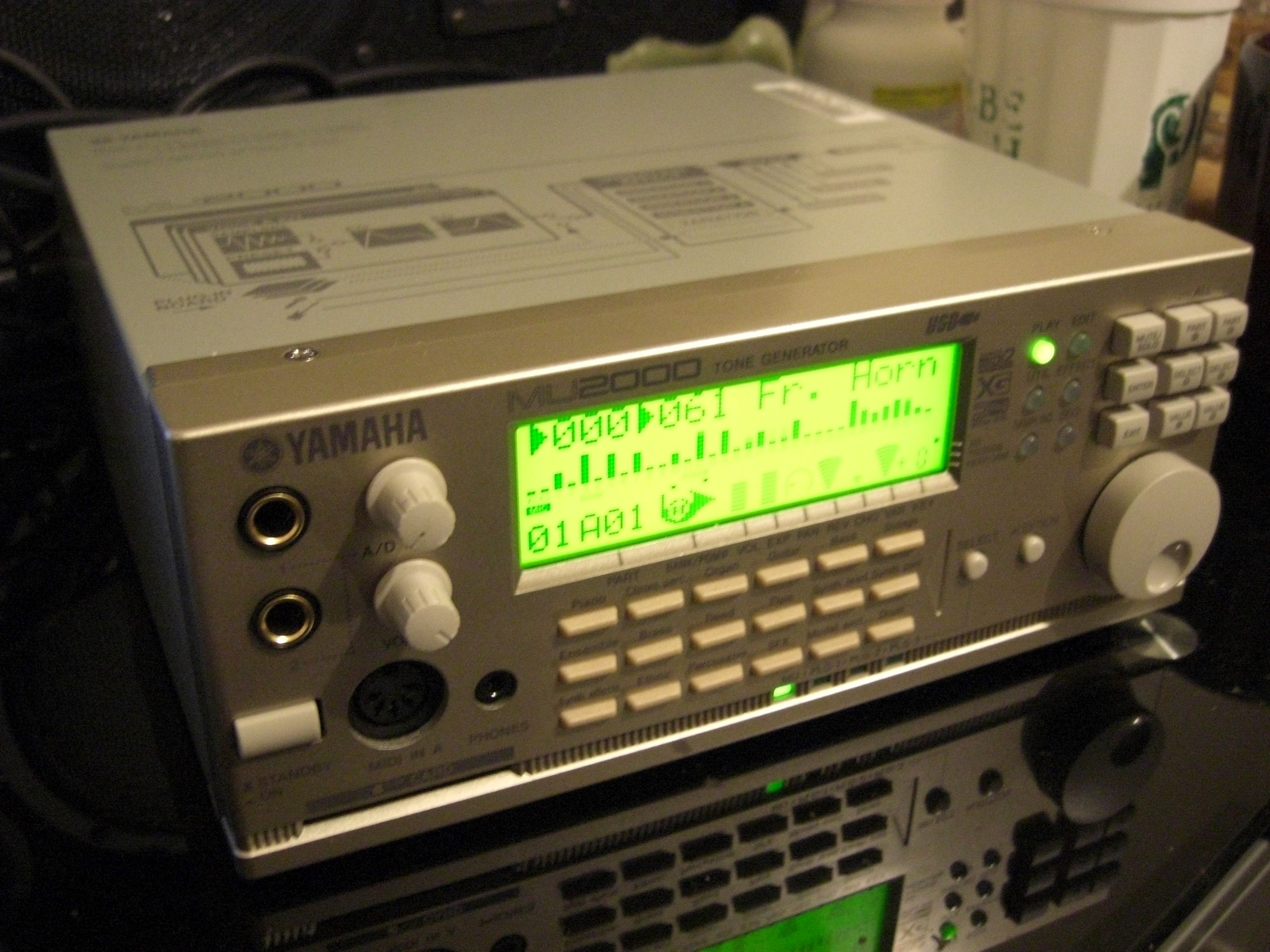
Yamaha MU2000 tone generator

Introduced by Yamaha in 1994, XG (Extended General MIDI) is a proprietary extension to the General MIDI (GM) standard. It is similar in purpose to Roland's GS standard from 1991, but on a wider scope. Products compatible with the XG standard carry the XG logo.

== Description ==
As with the original General MIDI standard, the XG specification is a framework to ensure predictable playback of MIDI song data, and to facilitate the exchange of song data across compatible systems. This was seen as having natural benefits for musicians, but also for the wider computer market, although games had generally started to move away from MIDI technology at the time of its introduction.

Compared to the GM standard, which specified a fixed sound set of 128 normal instrument voices and a single drum kit, the XG standard included provisions for a larger palette of available instrument and drum sounds (480 normal voices and 11 drum kits minimum) and the means for calling these up using Bank Select MIDI messages. It also prescribed a widened set of controllers and parameters, also accessible via MIDI, that composers could employ to adjust the basic sounds and achieve greater subtlety and realism in their compositions. The XG standard stipulated an external input for instruments/microphones, which could be processed with the built-in effects and mixed with the synthesized sound.

The XG specification introduced a multi-purpose "Variation" effect processor in addition to the global Chorus and Reverb effects found in General MIDI devices. The Variation processor can be employed as a 'system' effect shared by all parts, or as an 'insertion' effect applying processing to a single part. The Variation block features effects like rotary speaker, compression, distortion, guitar amp simulation, wah-wah, etc. Yamaha's in-house songwriters often utilized these tools to demonstrate the power of the XG format, notably recreating guitar leads complete with feedback, flamenco guitar with distinct picked/hammered notes and finger slides, growling saxophones, and even a very convincing sitar.

Employing a scaled-down version of Yamaha's AWM2 (second generation Advanced Wave Memory) digital tone generator technology, the first generations of XG devices included an onboard 4 MB wave ROM chip containing sampled instrument sounds. Later products increased the size of the wave ROM as new instrument voices were added and sample quality was improved.

XG would eventually also include support for the PLG series plug-in expansion boards, that could be installed in compatible synthesizers. Available boards included models based on virtual analog, virtual acoustic and FM-synthesis technologies, a vocal harmony effect, and high-grade AWM2-based percussion and piano samples.

Many XG-compatible tone generators can be switched into a so-called TG300B mode, which provides access to extra instrument and drum sounds. This operating mode takes its name from an earlier tone generator module from Yamaha, the TG300 (1994), which predated XG, but in its B-mode offered unofficial compliance with the Roland GS standard. In 2001, Yamaha certified their MU500, MU1000 and MU2000 tone generator modules, as well as the S-YXG50 software synthesizer, for a licensed GS mode. On the hardware units, the GS mode replaced the TG300B mode via a free firmware update.

== Specification levels ==
The XG standard evolved over time, and two superseding levels were added as products became more advanced:

XG specification levels
Specification	Tone Generator	Available instrument sounds (minimum)
XG Level 1 (1994)	16 channels 32 note polyphony	480 normal instruments 11 drum/SFX kits
XG Level 2 (1997)	32 channels 64 note polyphony PLG support	1074 normal instruments 36 drum/SFX kits
XG Level 3 (1998)	64 channels 128 note polyphony PLG support	1149 normal instruments 37 drum/SFX kits

Additionally, a subset of XG known as XGlite was introduced in 2001. XGlite offers a set of 361 instruments (381 in some models), as well as a reduced number of available effect parameters and controllers.

Although the XG and XGlite specification do not actually specify polyphony, compatible tone generators generally provide a shared 32 notes of polyphony (when single-element voices are used) per 16 parts.

== XG product history ==
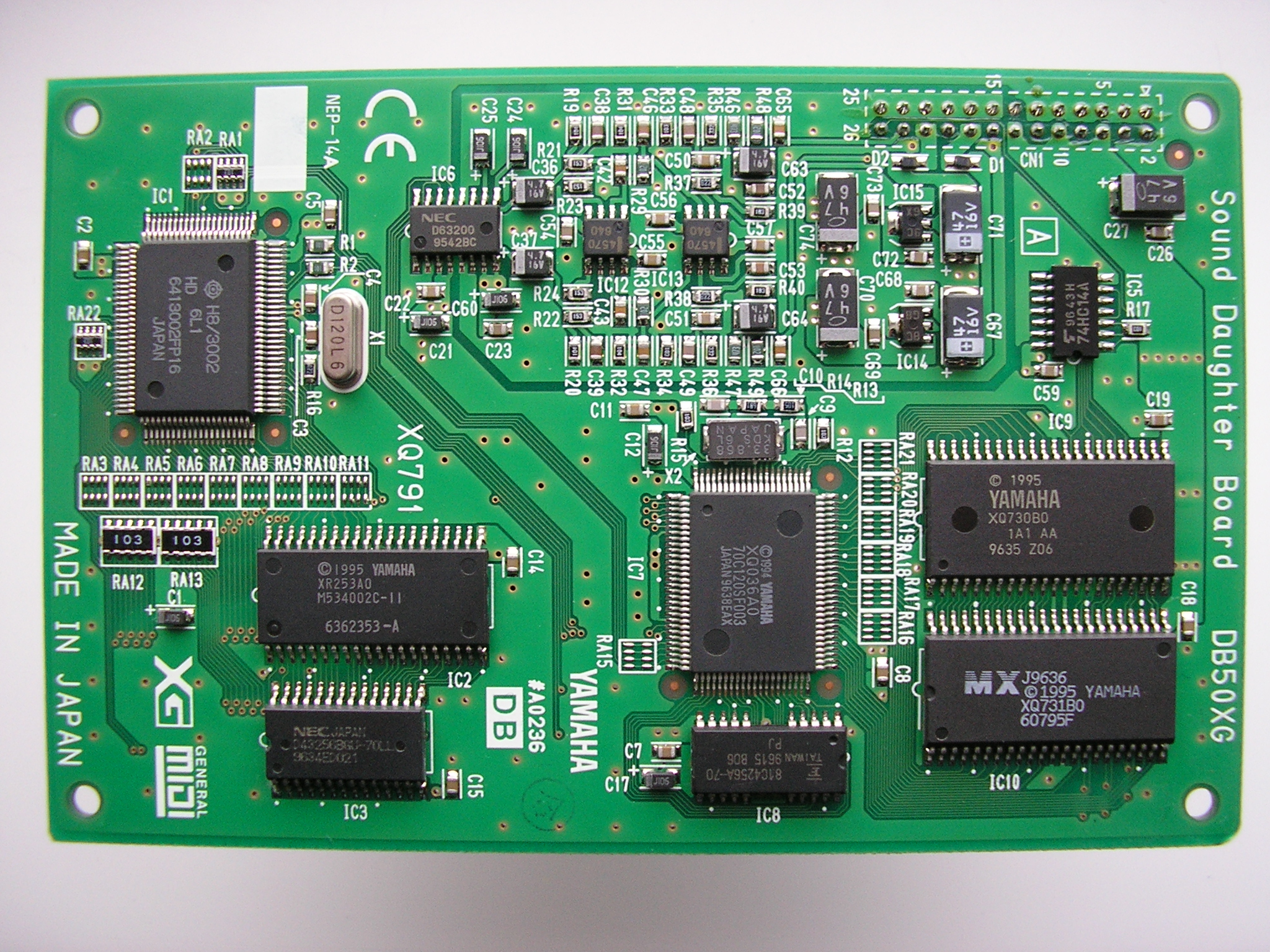
Yamaha DB50XG daughterboard

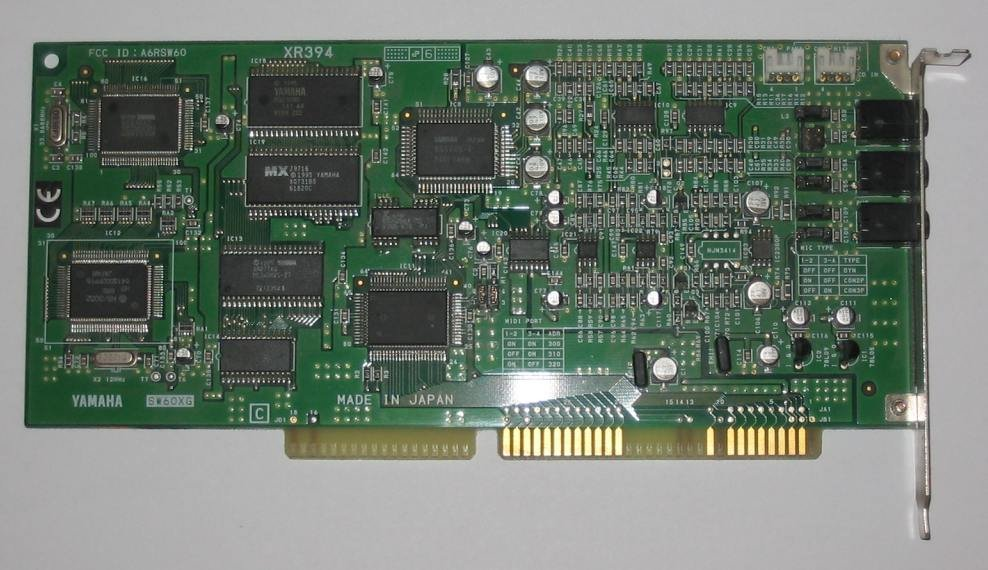
Yamaha SW60XG ISA sound card

- In 1994, the Yamaha MU80 tone generator was released as the first XG-compatible product.
- In 1995, the DB50XG Wave Blaster daughterboard was released. It interfaced with the Wave Blaster header on compatible computer sound cards in order to add XG support.
- In 1996, Yamaha introduced the MU10 tone generator module, often described as a "DB50XG in a case". Later in the year, the SW60XG ISA card for computers was released. The same year also saw the introduction of the CS1x synthesizer, which included XG compatibility, and the XGworks sequencer for Windows 95 computers.
- In 1997, the PSR-730 was released as the first XG-compatible digital keyboard. This year also saw XG being introduced into the QY-series portable sequencers, with the release of the QY70.
- In 1998, the SW1000XG PCI card combined a 32-part, 64-note polyphonic XG synthesizer comparable to the MU100 module, with high-quality audio recording and mixing capabilities for computers. The same year, the 64-part, 128-note polyphonic MU128 tone generator module was introduced.
- In 1999, the MU500, MU1000 and MU2000 tone generator modules were released exclusively for the Japanese market. The same year, the PLG100-XG expansion card for compatible synthesizers was introduced internationally, enabling XG support on compatible devices that did not meet the standard on their own.

== List of compatible products ==
XG equipment, Yamaha
- AR-100
- CBX-K1XG
- CGP-1000
- CLP-150
- CLP-170
- CLP-175
- CLP-270
- CLP-280
- CLP-295GP
- CLP-380
- CLP-480
- CLP-585
- CLP-685
- CLP-695GP
- CLP-970
- CLP-990
- CP300
- CS1x
- CS2x
- CSP-150
- CSP-170
- CSP-255
- CSP-275
- CSP-295
- CSP-295GP
- CVP-92
- CVP-94
- CVP-97
- CVP-98
- CVP-103
- CVP-105
- CVP-107
- CVP-109
- CVP-201
- CVP-202
- CVP-203
- CVP-204
- CVP-205
- CVP-206
- CVP-207
- CVP-208
- CVP-209
- CVP-210
- CVP-301
- CVP-303
- CVP-305
- CVP-307
- CVP-309
- CVP-309GP
- CVP-401
- CVP-403
- CVP-405
- CVP-407
- CVP-409
- CVP-409GP
- CVP-501
- CVP-503
- CVP-505
- CVP-509
- CVP-600
- CVP-601
- CVP-605
- CVP-609
- CVP-609GP
- CVP-700
- CVP-701
- CVP-705
- CVP-709
- CVP-709GP
- CVP-805
- CVP-809
- CVP-900
- CVP-905
- CVP-909
- CVP-909GP
- DD-65
- DD-75
- DB50XG
- DB51XG
- DB60XG
- DGX-200 (XGlite)
- DGX-202 (XGlite)
- DGX-203 (XGlite)
- DGX-205 (XGlite)
- DGX-220 (XGlite)
- DGX-230 (XGlite)
- DGX-300 (XGlite)
- DGX-305 (XGlite)
- DGX-500 (XGlite)
- DGX-505 (XGlite)
- DGX-520 (XGlite)
- DGX-530 (XGlite)
- DGX-620 (XGlite)
- DGX-630 (XGlite)
- DGX-640 (XGlite)
- DGX-650 (XGlite)
- DGX-660 (XGlite)
- DGX-670
- ELB-01
- ELB-02
- ELC-02
- ELS-01
- ELS-01C
- ELS-01X
- ELS-02
- ELS-02C
- ELS-02X
- EZ-200 (XGlite)
- EZ-220 (XGlite)
- EZ-250I (XGlite)
- EZ-310 (XGlite)
- EZ-J200 (XGlite)
- EZ-J210 (XGlite)
- EZ-J220 (XGlite)
- EZ-J24 (XGlite)
- EZ-J25 (XGlite)
- EZ-J53 (XGlite)
- Genos
- Genos2
- HD-300
- KB-190 (XGlite)
- KB-191 (XGlite)
- KB-208 (XGlite)
- KB-209 (XGlite)
- KB-280 (XGlite)
- KB-290 (XGlite)
- KB-291 (XGlite)
- KB-308 (XGlite)
- KB-309 (XGlite)
- KBP-300 (XGlite)
- KBP-500 (XGlite)
- KBP-1000 (XGlite)
- KBP-1100 (XGlite)
- KBP-2000 (XGlite)
- KBP-2100 (XGlite)
- MIE-3XG
- MU10
- MU15
- MU50
- MU80
- MU90
- MU100 (XG Level 2)
- MU128 (XG Level 3)
- MU500 (XG Level 3)
- MU1000 (XG Level 3)
- MU2000 (XG Level 3)
- NP-V60 (XGlite)
- NP-V80 (XGlite)
- P-250
- P-515
- P-525
- PF-500
- PF-1000
- PLG100-XG
- PSR-273 (XGlite)
- PSR-275 (XGlite)
- PSR-290 (XGlite)
- PSR-292 (XGlite)
- PSR-293 (XGlite)
- PSR-295 (XGlite)
- PSR-350
- PSR-450
- PSR-530
- PSR-540
- PSR-550
- PSR-630
- PSR-640
- PSR-730
- PSR-740
- PSR-1000
- PSR-1100
- PSR-1500
- PSR-2000
- PSR-2100
- PSR-3000
- PSR-8000
- PSR-9000
- PSR-A300 (XGlite)
- PSR-A350 (XGlite)
- PSR-A1000
- PSR-A2000
- PSR-A3000
- PSR-A5000
- PSR-E213 (XGlite)
- PSR-E223 (XGlite)
- PSR-E233 (XGlite)
- PSR-E243 (XGlite)
- PSR-E244 (XGlite)
- PSR-E253 (XGlite)
- PSR-E263 (XGlite)
- PSR-E273 (XGlite)
- PSR-E283 (XGlite)
- PSR-E303 (XGlite)
- PSR-E313 (XGlite)
- PSR-E323 (XGlite)
- PSR-E333 (XGlite)
- PSR-E343 (XGlite)
- PSR-E344 (XGlite)
- PSR-E353 (XGlite)
- PSR-E360 (XGlite)
- PSR-E363 (XGlite)
- PSR-E373 (XGlite)
- PSR-E383 (XGlite)
- PSR-E403 (XGlite)
- PSR-E413 (XGlite)
- PSR-E423 (XGlite)
- PSR-E433 (XGlite)
- PSR-E443 (XGlite)
- PSR-E453 (XGlite)
- PSR-E463 (XGlite)
- PSR-E473 (XGlite)
- PSR-E483 (XGlite)
- PSR-E583 (XGlite)
- PSR-EW300 (XGlite)
- PSR-EW310 (XGlite)
- PSR-EW320 (XGlite)
- PSR-EW400 (XGlite)
- PSR-EW410 (XGlite)
- PSR-EW425 (XGlite)
- PSR-I300 (XGlite)
- PSR-I400 (XGlite)
- PSR-I425 (XGlite)
- PSR-I455 (XGlite)
- PSR-I500 (XGlite)
- PSR-I510 (XGlite)
- PSR-I610 (XGlite)
- PSR-J51
- PSR-K1 (XGlite)
- PSR-OR700
- PSR-R300 (XGlite)
- PSR-S500 (XGlite)
- PSR-S550
- PSR-S650
- PSR-S670
- PSR-S700
- PSR-S710
- PSR-S750
- PSR-S770
- PSR-S775
- PSR-S900
- PSR-S910
- PSR-S950
- PSR-S970
- PSR-S975
- PSR-SX600
- PSR-SX620
- PSR-SX700
- PSR-SX720
- PSR-SX900
- PSR-SX920
- PSR-VN300 (XGlite)
- QS300
- QY70
- QY100
- QY700
- SKB-J700 (XGlite)
- SW60XG
- SW1000XG (XG Level 2)
- S-YXG50
- S-YXG100
- S-YXG2006LE (XGlite)
- Tyros
- Tyros2
- Tyros3
- Tyros4
- Tyros5
- YDP-V240 (XGlite)
- YMF7x0
- YMF7x4
- YPG-225 (XGlite)
- YPG-235 (XGlite)
- YPG-525 (XGlite)
- YPG-535 (XGlite)
- YPG-625 (XGlite)
- YPG-635 (XGlite)
- YPT-210 (XGlite)
- YPT-220 (XGlite)
- YPT-230 (XGlite)
- YPT-240 (XGlite)
- YPT-255 (XGlite)
- YPT-260 (XGlite)
- YPT-270 (XGlite)
- YPT-280 (XGlite)
- YPT-300 (XGlite)
- YPT-310 (XGlite)
- YPT-320 (XGlite)
- YPT-330 (XGlite)
- YPT-340 (XGlite)
- YPT-360 (XGlite)
- YPT-370 (XGlite)
- YPT-380 (XGlite)
- YPT-400 (XGlite)
- YPT-410 (XGlite)
- YPT-420 (XGlite)
- YPT-W320 (XGlite)
XG equipment, other manufacturers
- Edirol SD-20 (XGlite)
- Edirol SD-80 (XGlite)
- Edirol SD-90 (XGlite)
- Korg N1
- Korg NS5R
- Korg NX5R
- Roland BK5 (XGlite)

== Related products ==
- Yamaha's YMF7x0 and YMF7x4 chipsets for onboard and PCI computer sound cards had a scaled-down XG-compatible MIDI synth built-in.
- The Yamaha DB60XG daughterboard (a DB50XG with an analog input) was available only in Japan.
- The Yamaha S-YXG50 SoftSynthesizer was an entirely software-based MIDI synth for Windows computers. It used the original 4 MB XG wavetable, but could optionally make use of a lower quality 2 MB sound set to perform better on less powerful systems.
- Yamaha XGworks was a software MIDI sequencer with rudimentary audio multitracking facilities, released for the Windows 95 platform. Version 3 (1998) was also ported to Macintosh OS8/9. Version 4 reverted to being Windows-only, including NT-based Windows versions, but was only available in Japan. Later developments (SOL/SOL2/XGworks ST) were also only released for the Japanese market, but a scaled-down version (SQ01) was shipped with various Yamaha equipment internationally.

== See also ==
- Comparison of MIDI standards
- Yamaha MU-series sound modules
