= Environmental Audio Extensions =

Digital signal processing software for audio

- Creative EAX logo
- Original author: Creative Technology
- Developer: Creative Technology
- Release: 1999
- Final release: 5.0 / 2005
- License: Proprietary

The Environmental Audio Extensions (or EAX) are a number of digital signal processing presets for audio, present in Creative Technology Sound Blaster sound cards starting with the Sound Blaster Live and the Creative NOMAD/Creative ZEN product lines. Due to the release of Windows Vista in 2007, which deprecated the DirectSound3D API that EAX was based on, Creative discouraged EAX implementation in favour of its OpenAL-based EFX equivalent – though at that point relatively few games used the API.

== Technology ==
EAX is a library of extensions to Microsoft's DirectSound3D, itself an extension to DirectSound introduced with DirectX 3 in 1996 with the intention to standardize 3D audio for Microsoft Windows, adding environmental audio presets to DS3D's audio positioning. Ergo, the aim of EAX has nothing to do with 3D audio positioning, this is usually done by a sound library like DirectSound3D or OpenAL. Rather, EAX can be seen as a library of sound effects written and compiled to be executed on a DSP instead of the CPU, often called "hardware-accelerated".

The aim of EAX was to create more ambiance within video games by more accurately simulating a real-world audio environment. Up to EAX 2.0, the technology was based around the effects engine aboard the E-mu 10K1 on Creative Technology's and the Maestro2 on ESS1968 chipset driven sound cards. The hardware accelerated effects engine is an E-mu FX8010 DSP integrated into the Creative Technology's audio chip and was historically used to enhance MIDI output by adding effects (such as reverb and chorus) to the sampled instruments on 'wavetable' sample-based synthesis cards (which is often confused with the "wavetable synthesis" developed by Wolfgang Palm of PPG and Michael McNabb in the late-1970s, however not related). A similar effects DSP was also present on Creative's cards back to the AWE 32. However, the EMU10K1's DSP was faster and more flexible and was able to produce not only MIDI output but also other outputs, including the digital sound section.

Developers taking advantage of EAX choose an environment for their game's setting and the sound card uses the mathematical DSP digital filter presets for that environment. The original EAX was quite primitive, only offering 26 presets and 3 parameters for more accurate adjustment of the listener parameters and 1 parameter for the sources. Each revision of the technology increased the available effects. EAX Advanced HD (also known as EAX 3) and up provide support for new environmental transitions, new effects, and multiple active effects. Further additions include smooth changes between EAX environment presets and audio occlusion effects (simulating a wall between player and sound source).

EAX was used in many popular titles of the time, including Half-Life, Unreal Tournament, Splinter Cell, Rogue Spear, Doom 3, F.E.A.R., Counter-Strike, and Prey. These games support EAX 4.0 if audio hardware with an OpenAL-supporting driver is present. Because hardware acceleration for DirectSound and DirectSound3D was dropped in Windows Vista, OpenAL runtime software is required to enable EAX in many games, it still functions in Windows 10, although OpenAL was also discontinued by Creative. OpenAL Soft, an open source version of OpenAL, is still actively maintained, and can be used by game developers, and to enable EAX sound in older games.

Most releases of EAX versions coincided with increases in the number of simultaneous voices processable in hardware by the audio processor: the original EAX 1.0 supports 8 voices, while EAX 5.0 allows 128 voices (and up to 4 effects applied to each). Creative cards are generally backwards compatible with older EAX versions, although hardware accelerated DSP processing of these effects only happens on cards with EMU chips. Most audio solutions from Creative released after the X-Fi Titanium HD (except for the Audigy Rx) and other companies offer EAX software emulation of varying degrees instead.

=== EAX 1.0 ===
- 8 simultaneous voices processable in hardware
- 32 individual 3D voices
- Environmental Effect Presets
- Per-channel individual environmental presets
- Hardware DSP rendering
- Specification released in 1998

=== EAX 2.0 ===
EAX 2.0 is supported by Sound Blaster Live! sound cards

- 32 simultaneous voices processable in hardware
- Occlusion Effects
- Material-specific reverb parameters
- Specification released in 1999

=== EAX 3.0 ===
EAX 3.0 is supported by E-mu 10K-based products such as the Sound Blaster Audigy

- 64 simultaneous voices processable in hardware
- 'Smoothing' between 3D audio environments
- Direct access to all reverb parameters
- Environmental Panning
- New reverb engine
- Beginning of the AdvancedHD Designation from new reverb engine
- Specification released in 2001

=== EAX 4.0 ===
EAX 4.0 is supported by Audigy series sound cards.

- Real-time hardware effects
- Multiple simultaneous environments
- Flanger
- Echo
- Distortion
- Ring modulation effects
- Specification released in 2003

=== EAX 5.0 ===
EAX 5.0 is supported by E-mu 20K-based products such as the Sound Blaster X-Fi.

- 128 simultaneous voices processable in hardware and up to 4 effects on each
- EAX Voice (processing of microphone input signal)
- EAX PurePath (EAX Sound effects can originate from one speaker only)
- Environment FlexiFX (four available effects slots per channel)
- EAX MacroFX (realistic positional effects at close range)
- Environment Occlusion (sound from adjacent environments can pass through walls)
- Specification released in 2005

=== Future development ===
In Creative's OpenAL 1.1 specification, an alternative software system for 3D sound which Creative made, EAX should be considered deprecated as a developer interface. New development should use OpenAL's EFX interface, which emulates all previous EAX functionality and is more tightly coupled with the overall OpenAL framework.

Creative stopped updating OpenAL also, although an open source version, OpenAL Soft is still actively maintained.

== EAX emulation ==
When Windows Vista discontinued DirectSound3D, Creative made a software package called OpenAL which allows many Windows EAX-carrying games to play software and hardware (soundcard driven) mode EAX with varying success. OpenAL builds on the EAX extensions with EFX extensions. OpenAL still installs and functions on Windows 10, although is no longer actively maintained and released. An open source version called OpenAL Soft is available which is actively maintained, although it has less support for all versions of EAX.

Realtek released the "Realtek 3D Soundback Beta 0.1" software package to allow Realtek cards to play EAX and DirectSound3D on Windows Vista and newer operating systems. It may work with your Realtek soundcard in Windows 10. It requires Windows Vista compatibility mode to install.

nForce soundcards feature native support for EAX. The games that use EAX with nForce may need files changed to run properly.

Rapture3D supports EAX, it is a commercial wrapper for OpenAL used in games such as Dirt 3.

Wine implements software emulation of a subset of EAX.

In addition to physical soundcard devices, Creative released EAX emulation software (Creative ALchemy) for a range of computers and motherboards that had Creative-made onboard audio. Creative ALchemy will not function unless it detects a Creative Labs device.

=== Sound Blaster Audigy ADVANCED MB ===
- The Sound Blaster Audigy ADVANCED MB includes Creative Audio Center, Creative MediaSource 5 Player/Organizer, Creative WaveStudio 7, Creative ALchemy;

Also known as Sound Blaster Audigy ADVANCED MB, it is similar to Audigy 2 SE, but the software supports EAX 3.0, which supports 64-channel software wavetable (sample-based synthesis) with DirectSound acceleration, but without hardware accelerated 'wavetable' sample-based synthesis. DAC is rated 95 dB Signal-to-Noise Ratio.

It is available as an integrated option for Dell Inspiron, Studio and XPS notebooks.

Later versions of the driver support EAX 5.0.

=== Sound Blaster X-Fi MB ===
- The Sound Blaster X-Fi MB includes Entertainment Console, Creative Karaoke Player, Creative MediaSource 5 Player/Organizer, Creative WaveStudio 7, Creative Audio Console, Creative ALchemy.

It features:

- EAX 5.0 and OpenAL support
- Crystallizer
- CMSS-3D
- SVM
- Graphic Equalizer
- Creative ALchemy (Windows Vista and Windows 7 only, is used for providing EAX in Vista)
- Console Launcher (Entertainment Mode)
- Audio Console
- Karaoke Player
- Creative WaveStudio
- Creative MediaSource

Unlike its predecessor, Audigy Advanced MB, X-Fi MB does not include a software-based SoundFont synthesizer. Another difference is that it has the option to run in 30-day trial mode.

== Audio player versions ==
EAX-like technology is also present in several digital audio players by Creative Technologies, such as the NOMAD and ZEN lines. In these devices, the following effects and features are implemented:

- Different reverb-like environments
- Speed-shifting (slower or faster)
- Environment adaptation (train, plane, public place etc.)
- Sound image (broad, narrow etc.)
- A simple graphical equalizer

== Games with EAX Support ==
Game	EAX 1	EAX 2	EAX HD 3	EAX HD 4	EAX HD 5	Notes
25 to Life						
Abomination: The Nemesis Project	X					
Age of Empires III						* Supported by ALchemy
Age of Conan: Hyborian Adventures						
Alias						
Aliens versus Predator	X					
Alone in the Dark: The New Nightmare						
Alpha Centauri	X					
Alpha Prime				X		
America's Army			X			
American McGee's Alice		X				
Anachronox	X					
Aquanox	X					
Aquanox 2						
ArmA: Armed Assault						
Arx Fatalis						
Assassin's Creed				X		* Supported by ALchemy
Baldur's Gate	X					
Baldur's Gate 2	X					* Supported by ALchemy
Battle Isle: The Andosia War						
Battle for Middle-earth			X			
Battle for Middle Earth 2			X			* Supported by ALchemy
Battlezone	X					
Battlezone II: Combat Commander	X					
Battle for Middle-earth II: The Rise of the Witch-king.						
Battlefield 2	X	X	X	X	X	* Supported by ALchemy
Battlefield 2142	X	X	X	X	X	* Supported by ALchemy
Battlefield Vietnam		X	X			* Supported by ALchemy
Battlezone II	X					
Beyond Good & Evil						
BioShock					X	EAX 5 (via OpenAL) * Supported by ALchemy
Black & White						
Blade of Darkness	X					
The Blair Witch Project Volume I-III	X					
Blood II: The Chosen & The Nightmare Levels	X					
BloodRayne			X			
Brian Lara International Cricket 2007						* Supported by ALchemy
Brothers in Arms: Earned in Blood						
Brothers in Arms: Road to Hill 30			X			
Brothers in Arms: Hell's Highway						
Call of Duty	X	X	X			Patch 1.3 * Supported by ALchemy
Call of Duty 2	X	X	X			* Supported by ALchemy
Call of Juarez						
Carmageddon TDR 2000		X				
Carnivores: Cityscape	X					
Carnivores: Ice Age		X				
Carnivores 2		X				
Catwoman						
Cellfactor: Revolution						
Chaser						
Chrome						
Chronicles of Riddick: Escape from Butcher Bay						* Supported by ALchemy
Civilization IV		X	X	X		* Supported by ALchemy
Civilization IV: Beyond the Sword		X	X	X		
Civilization IV: Warlords		X	X	X		
Civilization IV: Colonization		X	X	X		
City of Heroes						
City of Villains						
Clive Barker's Undying						
Cold War			X			* Supported by ALchemy
Colin McRae Rally 3						
Colin McRae Rally 04				X		
Colin McRae Rally 2005				X		
Colin McRae: Dirt					X	EAX 5 (via OpenAL) * Supported by ALchemy
Combat: Task Force 121						
Command & Conquer: Generals						* Supported by ALchemy
Command & Conquer: Renegade		X				
Command & Conquer 3: Tiberium Wars						
Commandos Strike Force						
Condemned: Criminal Origins				X		
Conflict: Global Storm						
Conflict: Vietnam						
Counter-Strike		X				
Crime Cities	X					
Croc 2	X					
Crusaders of Might and Magic	X					
Cryostasis: Sleep of Reason						
Crysis						* Supported by ALchemy; not all the sounds are reverbed, dialog plays fine.
Crysis Warhead						
Daikatana						
Dark and Light						
Darkness Within: In Pursuit of Loath Nolder						
Dark Vengeance	X					
Day of Defeat		X				
Demolition Racer	X					
Descent 3		X				
Descent 4		X				
Descent Freespace	X					
Deus Ex	X					
Diablo II	X	X				* Supported by ALchemy
Die Hard Trilogy 2: Viva Las Vegas	X					
Divine Divinity						
Dogs of War: Battle on Primus IV	X					
Doom 3				X		Patch 1.3 * Supported by ALchemy
Doom 3: BFG Edition						EAX support removed.
Dragon's Lair 3D: Return to the Lair	X					
Drakan	X					
Dreamfall: The Longest Journey			X	X		
Driver	X					
Driver 3			X			* Supported by ALchemy
Driver: Parallel Lines			X			
Drome Racers						
Dronez	X					
Dungeon Keeper II	X					
Dungeon Lords						
Dungeon Siege	X					* Supported by ALchemy
Dungeon Siege 2						
Dungeons & Dragons: Dragonshard						
East Front						
E-racer						
El Matador					X	* Supported by ALchemy
Elder Scrolls III: Morrowind						* Supported by ALchemy
Elder Scrolls IV: Oblivion		X				Use Side's EAX Control mod. * Supported by ALchemy
Elite Warriors: Vietnam	X	X	X			
Enter the Matrix					X	* Supported by ALchemy
Eurofighter Typhoon		X				
Euro League Football	X					
EverQuest	X					
EverQuest 2						* Supported by ALchemy
Evil Dead: Hail to the King	X					
Evolva	X					
Expendable	X					
F.E.A.R.		X	X	X		* Supported by ALchemy
F.E.A.R. Extraction Point		X	X	X		
F.E.A.R. Perseus Mandate		X	X	X		
F1 Grand Prix 4	X					
Fallout Tactics: Brotherhood of Steel		X				
Fallout 3						May require DirectSound3D restoration software or ALchemy to restore proper audio functionality on Vista and later. Set bEnableEnviroEffectsOnPC=1 in Fallout.ini
Far Cry		X				* Supported by ALchemy
Far Cry 2			X			* Supported by ALchemy
FIFA 99	X					
Final Fantasy VIII		X				
Final Fantasy XI						
Flying Heros						
Ford Racing	X					
Freedom Force	X	X				
Freedom: The Battle for Liberty Island aka Freedom Fighters						
Freelancer						
Freespace 2	X					
From Dusk Till Dawn	X					
Full Spectrum Warrior						* Supported by ALchemy
Full Spectrum Warrior: Ten Hammers						* Supported by ALchemy
Fur Fighters	X					
Future Beat 3D						
Gears of War						* Supported by ALchemy // Stereo only // Hardware openal by edited ini file
Ghost Master						
Giants: Citizen Kabuto	X					
Global Operations						
The Godfather						
Gothic	X	X				
Gothic 2	X	X				
Gothic 3						
GP 500	X					
Grand Theft Auto II	X					Also supports A3D 2.0.
Grand Theft Auto III	X		X			Also supports A3D 2.0. * Supported by ALchemy
Grand Theft Auto: Vice City	X		X			Also supports A3D 2.0. // via manual edit of the settings file * Supported by ALchemy
Grand Theft Auto: San Andreas	X	X	X	X		* Supported by ALchemy
Race Driver: Grid						* Supported by ALchemy
Guild Wars						* Supported by ALchemy
Gulf War: Operation Desert Hammer	X					
GUN						
Half-Life	X					Steam version does not support it anymore since the 2013 patch.
Half-Life: Blue Shift	X					Steam version does not support it anymore since the 2013 patch.
Half-Life: Opposing Force	X					Steam version does not support it anymore since the 2013 patch.
Halo: Combat Evolved		X				* Supported by ALchemy
Hardwar	X					
Heavy Metal: F.A.K.K.²		X				
Heli Heroes	X					
Hellgate: London						
Heretic II	X					
Heroes of Might and Magic V						
Hidden & Dangerous 2			X			
High Heat Baseball 2000	X					
High Heat Baseball 2002	X					
Hitman 2: Silent Assassin			X			* Supported by ALchemy
Hitman: Blood Money				X		* Supported by ALchemy
Hitman: Codename 47		X				* Supported by ALchemy
Hitman: Contracts				X		* Supported by ALchemy
Hostile Waters	X					
Icewind Dale	X					
Icewind Dale 2	X					
IL-2 Sturmovik: 1946	X	X	X			* Supported by ALchemy
Incoming Forces		X				
Indiana Jones and the Infernal Machine						
Infernal						
Isabelle	X					
James Bond 007: Nightfire						
JHexen		X				
Juiced						
Kane & Lynch: Dead Men						
Killing Floor			X			
Killing Floor 2					X	
Klingon Honor Guard						
Lander	X					
Legends of Might and Magic		X				
Lego Racers 2						
Lineage II						OpenAL
Line of Sight: Vietnam	X	X	X			
The Lord of the Rings Online						
The Lord of the Rings: The Return of the King						
Lost Pain: TakeDown						
Mace Griffin: Bounty Hunter						
Madden NFL 2000	X					
Madden NFL 99	X					
Mafia			X			* Supported by ALchemy
Mage Knight: Apocalypse						* Supported by ALchemy
Manhunt			X			* Supported by ALchemy
Martian Gothic: Unification	X					
Mass Effect			X	X	X	
The Matrix Online						
The Matrix: Path of Neo						EAX option in INI. Use ALchemy
Max Payne						
Max Payne 2		X				* Supported by ALchemy
MDK2	X					* Supported by ALchemy
MechWarrior 4	X					
Medal of Honor Allied Assault	X	X				* Supported by ALchemy
Medal of Honor: Pacific Assault						
Medieval II: Total War				X		* Supported by ALchemy
Men of War: Assault Squad						
Messiah		X				
Midnight GT		X				
Might and Magic VII: For Blood and Honor	X	X				
Might and Magic VIII: Day of the Destroyer	X					
Might and Magic IX		X				
Monster Madness						
Mortyr 2093 - 1944	X					
Most Wanted						
Moto Racer 2	X					
Motocross Madness 2						
Motorhead	X					
Mutant Chronicles: Warzone Online	X					
Myst Online: Uru Live						
Myst V: End of Ages						
Myth II: Soulblighter	X					
Myth III	X					
NASCAR Revolution	X					
Need for Speed: Carbon						
Need For Speed: High Stakes	X					
Need for Speed III: Hot Pursuit	X					
Need for Speed: Hot Pursuit 2						
Need for Speed: Most Wanted						
Need for Speed: Underground 2						
Nerf Arena Blast	X					
Neverwinter Nights	X	X	X			Supports A3D 1.0, A3D 2.0. * Supported by ALchemy
Neverwinter Nights 2	X	X	X			* Supported by ALchemy
New York Race						
NHL 2000						
No One Lives Forever						
No One Lives Forever 2: A Spy in H.A.R.M.'s Way		X				* Supported by ALchemy
Nocturne	X					
Off Road	X					
Operation Flashpoint: Cold War Crisis						
Operation Flashpoint: Resistance						
Operation Flashpoint 2						
Outcast	X					
Pacman 3D						
Painkiller			X			
Panzer Elite	X					
Pariah						
Paris Dakar Rally			X			
Peter Jackson's King Kong						
Planescape: Torment	X					
PlanetSide						
Play Online						
Populous: The Beginning	X					
Powerslide	X					
Prey (2006 video game)						* Supported by ALchemy
Prince of Persia 2008						
Prince of Persia: 3D	X					
Prince of Persia: The Two Thrones				X		
Prince of Persia: Warrior Within	X	X	X			EAX Unified. Compatible with EAX 1, 2, and 3.
Prince of Persia: The Sands of Time			X			
Pro Evolution Soccer 2008						
Project Eden	X					
Project I.G.I.-2: Covert Strike						Not wrapped by alchemy
Psychonauts						
Quake 4					X	EAX 5 (via OpenAL) * Supported by ALchemy
Rage Rally		X				
Rail Simulator						
Railroad Tycoon 3	X	X	X			* Supported by ALchemy
Rally Championship 2000	X					
Re-Volt		X				
Red Faction	X					
Red Faction 2						
Red Orchestra: Ostfront 41-45						
Redline Racer	X					
The Regiment						* Supported by ALchemy
Rent A Hero (1999)	X					
Requiem: Avenging Angel	X					
Resident Evil 2	X					
Revenant	X					
Revolution						
Rent a Hero						
Richard Burns Rally						
Ricky Ponting International Cricket 2007						
Rise of Nations: Rise of Legends						
Road Wars	X					
Rollcage	X					
Rollcage Stage II	X					
Rome: Total War		X	X			* Supported by ALchemy
Rune: Halls of Valhalla		X				
S.T.A.L.K.E.R.: Shadow of Chernobyl		X				EAX works through OpenAL. Do not use ALchemy. * Supported by ALchemy
S.T.A.L.K.E.R.: Clear Sky		X				EAX works through OpenAL. Do not use ALchemy.
S.T.A.L.K.E.R.: Call of Pripyat		X				EAX works through OpenAL. Do not use ALchemy.
Sacred						* Supported by ALchemy; replace SOUNDQUALITY : 1 with SOUNDQUALITY : 2 in Settings.cfg
Sacrifice	X					
Sammy Sosa: Softball Slam	X					
Sanity: Aiken's Artifact	X					
Scarface: The World Is Yours						
Screamer 4x4						
Secret Service: In Harm’s Way			X			
Sega Rally Championship	X					
Serious Sam	X					
Serious Sam II		X	X			* Supported by ALchemy
Serious Sam: The First Encounter		X				* Supported by ALchemy
Serious Sam: The Second Encounter		X				* Supported by ALchemy
Shade: Wrath of Angels			X			
Shadow Ops: Red Mercury						
Shadow Force: Razor Unit			X			
Shogo: Mobile Armor Division	X					
Sid Meier's Pirates!						
Sid Meier's Railroads!			X			* Supported by ALchemy
Silent Hunter 3						
Silkroad Online						
The Sims 2 Seasons						
SimCity 3000	X					
SimTheme Park	X					
SiN	X					
Sin Mission Pack: Wages of Sin						
Slave Zero		X				
Sniper: Art of Victory			X			* Supported by ALchemy
Soldier of Fortune		X				
Soldier of Fortune II: Double Helix			X			
Soldier of Fortune: Payback						
Soldner: Secret Wars						
Space Force: Rogue Universe						
Spec Ops II: Green Berets	X					
SpellForce 2: Shadow Wars						
Spirit of Speed	X					
Starcraft						* Supported by ALchemy
Star Trek: Bridge Commander						
Star Trek: Deep Space Nine: The Fallen	X					
Star Trek: Elite Force II			X			
Star Trek: The Next Generation: Klingon Honor Guard	X					
Star Trek: Voyager – Elite Force		X				
Star Wars: Battlefront				X		
Star Wars Battlefront 2						
Star Wars Empire at War						* Supported by ALchemy
Star Wars Empire at War: Forces of Corruption						
Star Wars Episode I: The Phantom Menace	X					
Star Wars Galaxies		X				* Supported by ALchemy
Star Wars Jedi Knight II: Jedi Outcast			X			Patch 1.03 * Supported by ALchemy
Star Wars Jedi Knight: Jedi Academy				X		* Supported by ALchemy
Star Wars: Knights of the Old Republic			X			* Supported by ALchemy
Star Wars: Knights of the Old Republic 2			X			EAX Support removed in latest Steam version. * Supported by ALchemy
Star Wars Republic Commando			X			* Supported by ALchemy
STOLEN						
Street Racing Syndicate						
Stronghold	X					
Stubbs the Zombie						
Stunt GP						
The Suffering						
The Suffering: Ties That Bind						
The Sum of All Fears		X				
Summoner	X					
Superbike 2001	X					
Supreme Commander						
SWAT 4						
Swedish Touring Car Championship	X					
Swedish Touring Car Championship 2	X					
System Shock 2	X					For further info, refer
The Temple of Elemental Evil						
Terminus	X					
Test Drive						
Test Drive 6	X					
Test Drive Rally		X				
Test Drive Unlimited						
The Devil Inside	X					
The Wheel Of Time	X					
Theme Park World						
Thief: Deadly Shadows			X	X		* Supported by ALchemy
Thief II: The Metal Age		X				A3D 2.0. See EAX support
Thief: The Dark Project	X					Also supports A3D 1.0.
The Dark Mod						
Thievery UT						
TimeShift						
Titan Quest						* Supported by ALchemy
Titan Quest: Immortal Throne						* Supported by ALchemy
TMNT						
TNN Outdoors Pro Hunter	X					
TOCA Race Driver			X			
TOCA Race Driver 2						
Tom Clancy's Ghost Recon		X				
Tom Clancy's Ghost Recon: Advanced Warfighter						* Supported by ALchemy
Tom Clancy's Ghost Recon: Desert Siege		X				
Tom Clancy's Ghost Recon: Island Thunder						
Tom Clancy's Rainbow Six: Lockdown						
Tom Clancy's Rainbow Six Rogue Spear & Black Thorn		X				* Supported by ALchemy
Tom Clancy's Rainbow Six: Vegas						* Supported by ALchemy
Tom Clancy's Rainbow Six Vegas 2						
Tom Clancy's Rainbow Six 3: Raven Shield			X			* Supported by ALchemy
Tom Clancy's Splinter Cell			X			* Supported by ALchemy
Tom Clancy's Splinter Cell: Chaos Theory			X			* Supported by ALchemy
Tom Clancy's Splinter Cell Double Agent			X			* Supported by ALchemy
Tom Clancy's Splinter Cell: Pandora Tomorrow			X			* Supported by ALchemy
Tomb Raider: Anniversary						
Tomb Raider: Legend						
Tomb Raider: The Angel of Darkness			X			* Supported by ALchemy
TrackMania Nations Forever						
Trackmania Original						
Trespasser	X					
Tribes 2	X					
Triple Play 2000	X					
TRON 2.0			X			* Supported by ALchemy
Tzar						
UFO Afterlight						* Supported by ALchemy
UFO Aftermath						
UFO Aftershock						
Ultimate Race Rally	X					
Ultimate Race Pro	X					
Ultima: Ascension	X					
Undying	X					
Universe at War: Earth Assault						
Unreal	X					First game to implement EAX 1.0 features. Also supports A3D 1.x, A3D 2.0, DirectSound3D.
Unreal Tournament		X				A3D 2.0
Unreal Tournament 2003			X			EAX 3 (via OpenAL). Supports EAX Unified. * Supported by ALchemy
Unreal Tournament 2004			X		X	EAX 5 support was added with patch (through OpenAL). * Supported by ALchemy
Unreal Tournament 3						* Supported by ALchemy
Unreal II: The Awakening			X			
Uprising 2: Lead and Destroy	X					
Urban Chaos	X					
Uru: Ages Beyond Myst						
Vampire: The Masquerade – Bloodlines		X				
Vanguard: Saga of Heroes						* Supported by ALchemy
VBS1						
VBS2						
Vietcong	X		X			
Vietcong 2			X			
Vivisector: Beast Inside						
Warcraft III		X				* Supported by ALchemy once, removed with 1.30 update
Wargasm						
Warhammer 40,000: Dawn of War: Soulstorm			X			
Warhammer: Mark of Chaos						
Warlords Battlecry		X				
Warmonger						
Way Point Zeta	X					
The Wheel of Time						
Wild Metal Country	X					
Wild Wild West: The Steel Assassin	X					
The Witcher						* Supported by ALchemy
Wizardry 8		X				
World of Warcraft						* Supported by ALchemy
WWII Tank Commander						
X3 Reunion						
Xpand Rally						
Ys: The Oath in Felghana		X				* Supported by ALchemy
Ys Origin		X				* Supported by ALchemy

== See also ==
- Convolution reverb
- OpenAL
- DirectSound
- A3D
- Dolby Surround / Dolby Pro Logic / Dolby Digital
- AMD TrueAudio
- Head-related transfer function (HRTF)
- Sound card
