= Sound Blaster Live! =

Sound card

Sound Blaster Live! logo

Sound Blaster Live! is a PCI add-on sound card from Creative Technology Limited for PCs. Moving from ISA to PCI allowed the card to dispense with onboard memory, storing digital samples in the computer's main memory and then accessing them in real time over the bus. This allowed for a much wider selection of, and longer playing, samples. It also included higher quality sound output at all levels, quadrophonic output, and a new MIDI synthesizer with 64 sampled voices. The Live! was introduced on August 11, 1998 and variations on the design remained Creative's primary sound card line into the early 2000s.

== Overview ==
EMU10K1 Digital Signal Processor

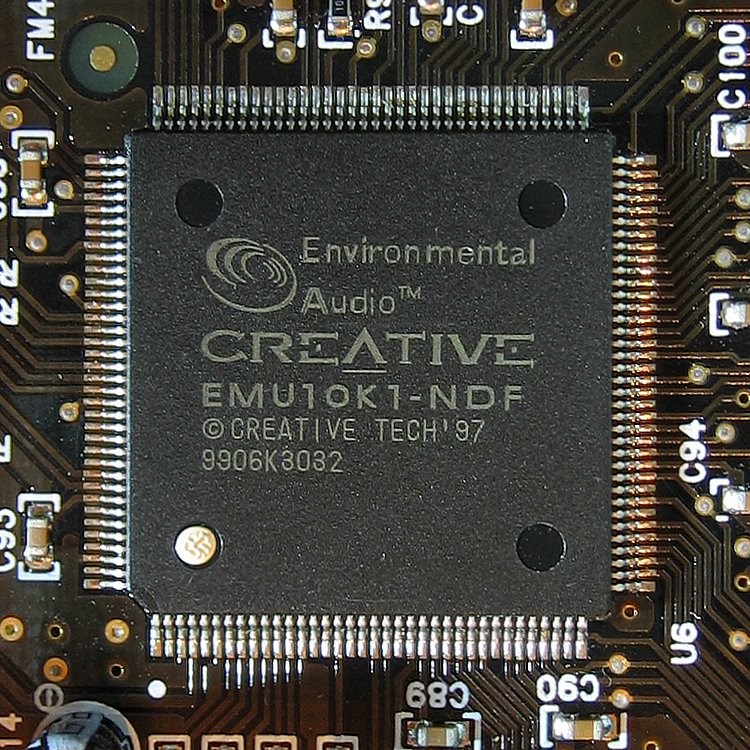
EMU10K1-NDF digital sound processor

Sound Blaster Live!

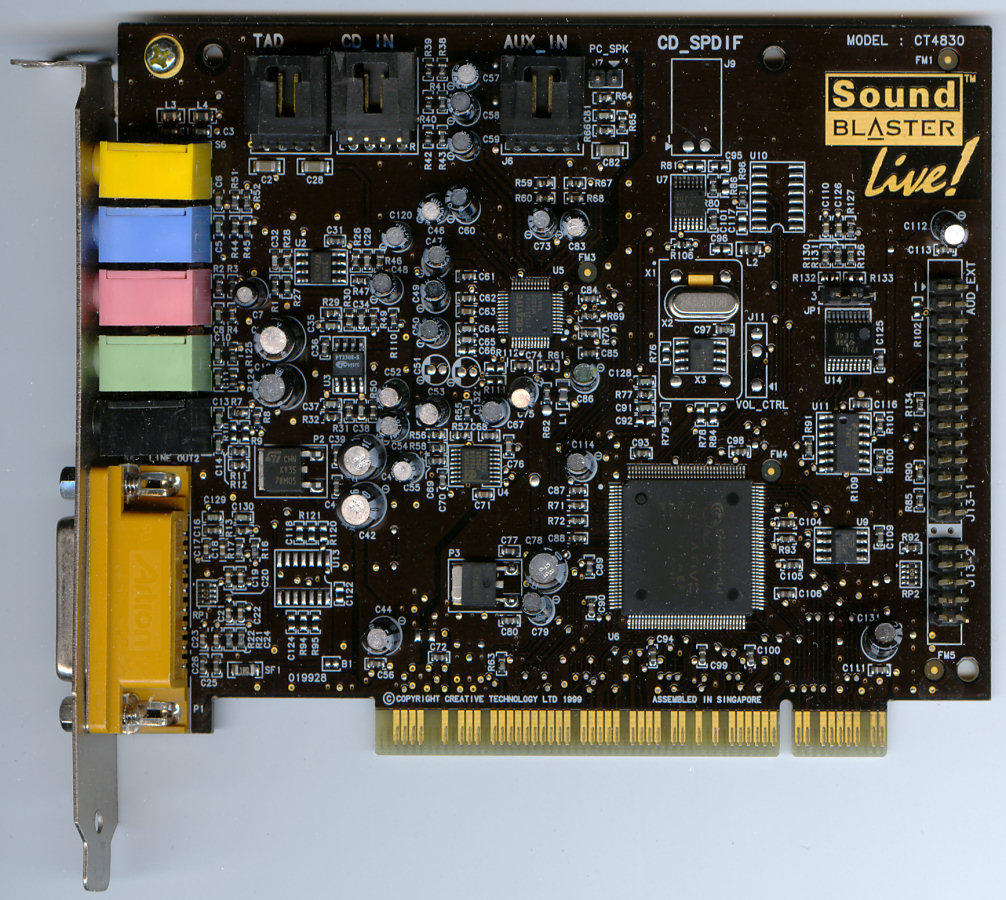
Sound Blaster Live! Value / Compaq / Intel / IBM / NEC

Sound Blaster Live! (August 1998) introduced the EMU10K1 audio processor. Manufactured in a 0.35 μm 3-metal-layer CMOS process, it is a 2.44 million transistor ASIC rated at 1000 MIPS. The EMU10K1 includes hardware acceleration for DirectSound and EAX 1.0 and 2.0 (environmental audio extensions), along with a high-quality 64-voice MIDI sample-based synthesizer and an integrated FX8010 DSP chip for real-time digital audio effects.

A major design change from the EMU8000 of the Sound Blaster AWE32 and Sound Blaster AWE64) was that the EMU10K1 uses system memory, accessed over the PCI bus, for the wavetable samples, rather than using expensive on-board memory. This was possible because systems were being equipped with far more RAM than previously, and PCI offered far faster and more efficient data transfer than the old ISA bus.

The integrated FX8010 was a 32-bit programmable processor with 1 kilobyte of instruction memory. It provided real-time postprocessing effects (such as reverb, flanging, or chorus). This capability let users select a pre-defined listening environment from a control-panel application (concert hall, theater, headphones, etc.) It also provided hardware-acceleration for EAX, Creative's environmental audio technology. The Effect algorithms were created by a development system that integrated into Microsoft Developer Studio. The effects were written in a language similar to C, and compiled into native FX8010 object code by its compiler, fxasm.

The Sound Blaster Live! has higher audio quality than previous Sound Blasters, as it processed the sound digitally at every stage, and because of its greater chip integration that reduced the analog signal losses of older, larger cards. However, digital processing brought some limitations. The DSP had an internal fixed sample rate of 48 kHz, a standard AC'97 clock, meaning that the EMU10K1 always captured external audio-sources at 48 kHz, then performed a sample rate conversion on the 48 kHz waveform to the requested target rate (such as 44.1 kHz or 32 kHz). This rate conversion step introduced intermodulation distortion into the downsampled output. However, the rate conversion was only applied when the audio signal was passed through the effects engine. The Sound Blaster Live! card had great difficulty with resampling audio CD source material (at 44.1 kHz) without introducing audible distortion. Creative addressed this concern by recommending recording audio exclusively at 48 kHz and using third-party software to handle the desired sample rate conversion to avoid using the EMU10K1's sample rate conversion.

Sound Blaster Live! supports multi-speaker output, initially up to a four-speaker setup. The software refers to this as a "4.1" setup, meaning 4 satellites and a subwoofer. While this is the case, the subwoofer is not on a separate output as it is with 5.1 and higher audio. Instead, a low-pass filter (crossover) within the speaker system removes high and midrange frequencies from the sound card's output for the subwoofer. Games see a "4.1" speaker system as quadraphonic because DirectSound itself offers no subwoofer output in this configuration. This is not limited to Creative sound cards; Aureal, Ensoniq, Philips, and other manufacturers have made cards that use four-speaker output in the same fashion. Later versions of the Live!, usually called Live! 5.1, offered 5.1-channel support which adds a center-channel speaker and LFE subwoofer output, most useful for movie watching where Dolby Digital 5.1 is decoded.

The Live! implemented MS-DOS legacy support via Ensoniq's AudioPCI DOS TSR program. Creative acquired Ensoniq in 1998 and, as part of the deal, made use of this highly compatible ISA sound card emulator with their newer cards. In fact, the Live! uses ".ecw" (Ensoniq Concert Wavetable) files for the wavetable emulation in DOS. The program enables support for many standards, such as Sound Blaster 16, General MIDI, AdLib (OPL3), among others.

Sound Blaster Live! was the first sound card from Creative with the "What U Hear" recording input source. This was supported in the Windows drivers, so no additional software was needed to utilize it. The analog stereo audio signal that came out of the main Line Out was directed into this input. That way, one could mix all available inputs and the MIDI synth into one stereo signal. When using "What U Hear" with 5.1 sound, the sound would be downmixed to stereo first. The Creative Recorder utility included with the sound card was specifically designed to take advantage of the "What U Hear" feature, making it a simple matter to capture streaming sound from any source, even from programs that deliberately avoid providing a means for saving the digital sounds, thus freeing non-technical users from the complexities of "patching" between inputs and outputs of various software modules.

== Design shortcomings ==
The original SB Live! had a very low noise floor for its time; however, a critical design flaw limited its application in quadraphonic audio. The two S/PDIF channels that each provided a stereo pair differed in their Digital to Analog reconstruction. Since the AC'97 chip provided an internal 48 kHz DAC, Creative chose not to implement two identical DAC pipelines, and the front-speaker audio pair was subjected to a different reconstruction and amplification regime to that of the rear channel (as evidenced by differently valued pull-up resistors and filter capacitors in the area forward of the AC'97 chip, in the specifications of the AC'97 itself, and in the use of different amplifier Op-Amps).

The rear channel was serviced by a separate, but arguably better Philips UDA1334 DAC, yet the Op-Amp used to boost the signal to output levels had a noticeably different frequency response envelope that was not normalized to the front channel, leaving a "thin and quiet" rear channel. To make matters worse, the rear channel Op-Amp was of the inverting variety without being treated as such, leaving the rear speakers out of phase with the front, requiring switchover. These problems were not encountered by those using the Gold editions' daughterboard 4-speaker digital-output, but the tendency of the AC'97 chip to fail when used as an input source to medium-impedance musical instruments removed the use of the front channels altogether, although the chip could be sourced from cheaper AC'97 compatible products and soldered into place. Nevertheless, simply redirecting front signal to rear output of SB Live! was for a long time a favorite trick for computer audio enthusiasts who want better sound for minimum of money.

Despite these problems, the original SB Live! can still be used well as a S/PDIF input/output and MIDI input/output device for network-connected digital audio workstation environments.

== Models ==
=== Sound Blaster Live! and Sound Blaster Live! Value ===
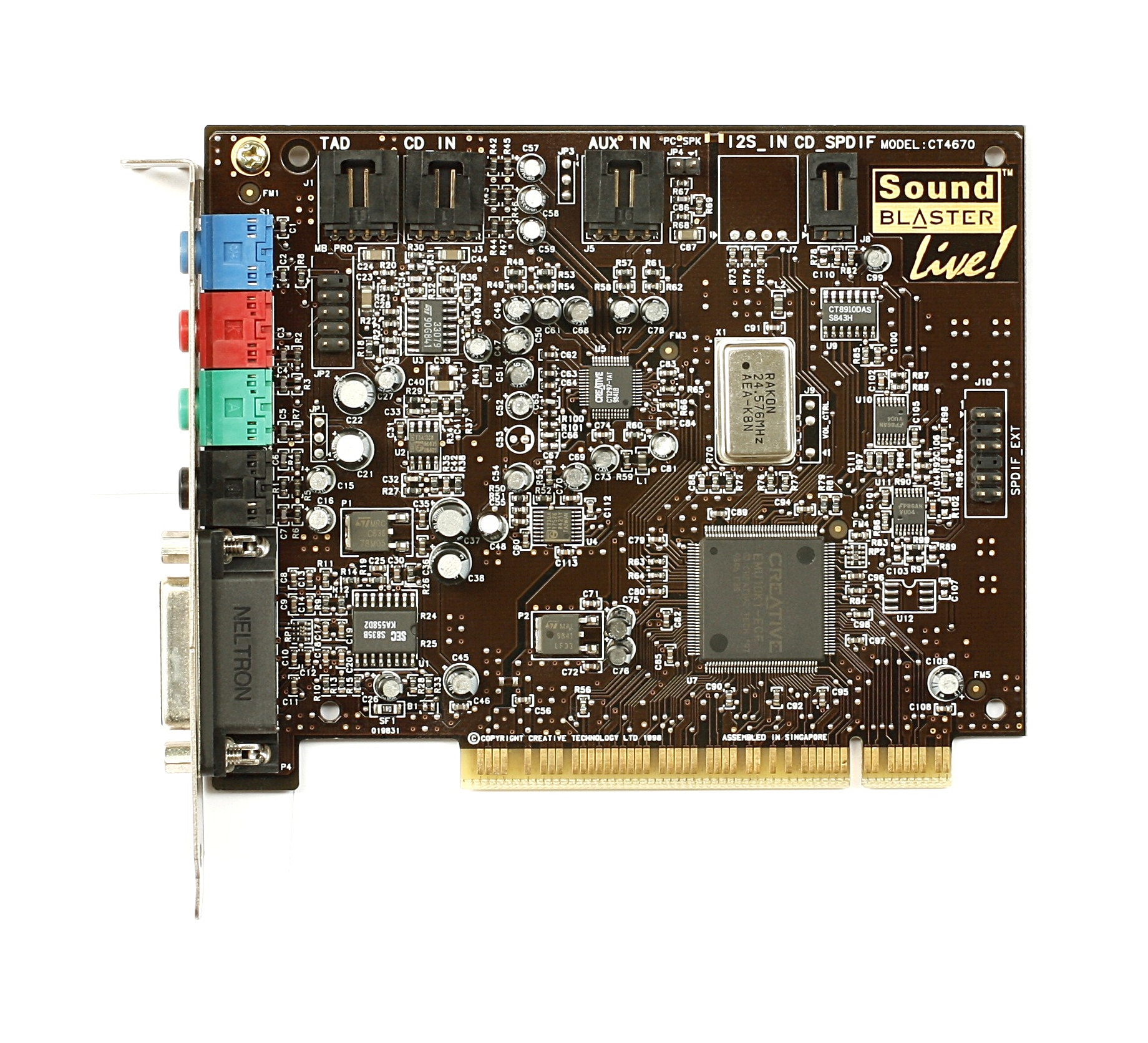
Sound Blaster Live! Value.

The Live! (CT4620) and Live! Value (CT4670) are the original autumn 1998 releases of the Live! family.

The flagship model of the 1st generation of the SB/Live family was the SB Live! Gold. Featuring gold tracings on all major analog traces and external sockets, an EMI-suppressing printed circuit board substrate and lacquer, the Gold came standard with a daughterboard (CT4660) that implemented a separate 4-channel alternative mini-DIN digital output to Creative-branded internal-DAC speaker sets, a S/P-DIF digital audio Input and Output with separate software mappings, and a fully decoded MIDI interface with separate Input and Output (along with on mini-DIN converter.) The daughterboard connected to the card via a 40-pin Audio Extension (AUD_EXT) connector. Live! Drive was not supplied with the card and only became available in early 1999 as an upgrade. Note, the Live! Drive used the same 40-pin Audio Extension (AUD_EXT) connector and the cable as the CT4660 daughterboard.

The original Sound Blaster Live!'s proprietary 9-pin mini-DIN connector for digital output was referred to by Creative as the "Mini Din.", it allowed the use of a microphone and digital speakers at the same time. This cannot be done with the value and base models of all subsequent Creative sound cards, as they share a single port for S/PDIF digital in/output and microphone connectivity. The Mini-DIN connection was not included in any subsequent Sound Blaster product, however owners of speaker systems that use this as the only digital input may buy an adapter from Creative.

The Gold highlighted many features aimed at music composition; ease-of-use (plug-and-play for musicians), real-time loopback-recording of the MIDI-synthesizer (with full freedom of Soundfonts, and environmental effects such as reverb, etc.), and bundled MIDI-software.

The Live! Value (CT4670) is similar to the full Live! with the exception that it has color-coded plastic connectors (mini-jacks) instead of gold and does not include the extended digital I/O card. The Value version also didn't have an 40-pin Audio Extension connector. It was replaced with a 12-pin SPDIF_EXT one which had only several Audio Extension signals (namely, inputs and outputs of S/PDIF digital interfaces).

The generation 2 of Sound Blaster Live! appeared in autumn of 1999. This family consisted of the Sound Blaster Live! Platinum, Sound Blaster Live! X-Gamer, Sound Blaster Live! MP3+, Sound Blaster Live! Player and a couple of OEM versions (Value versions). The retail versions of the Platinum, X-Gamer, MP3+ and Player were based on the CT4760 model. The CT4760 differed from the full version of the generation 1 card (CT4620) in a lack of a I2S connector, in an improved layout and in an additional stereo Digital-Out mini-jack which had front and rear channels in the S/PDIF format on the central and radial pins. The Platinum had a Live! Drive II, and the other cards differed only in software and in marketing outlets (the X-Gamer and MP3+ were meant only for North America). The OEM versions were primarily based on the CT4830 and differed from the retail ones in plastic mini-jacks of different colors (and sometimes in codec chips). On some CT4830 versions the CD_DIGITAL connector wasn't unsoldered. There were also such exotic cards as Sound Blaster PCI 512 which were delivered to Compaq and Dell.

The Platinum, X-Gamer, MP3+ and Player were all non-5.1 cards and only supported 4.0 (stereo with rear speaker support).

The generation 3 of Sound Blaster Live! cards appeared on the market in autumn of 2000. The family consisted of the same cards as the second generation one; they, however, were marked "5.1" which meant a support of 6-channel acoustic systems. All cards in the original release were based on the SB0060 model, including the OEM versions. They differed from the generation 2 cards in color plastic mini-jacks and in an additional support of central and sub channels via a non-standard 4-pin Digital/Analog Out mini-jack which could have either 3 digital-outs in the S/PDIF format (front, rear and central/sub) or analog-outs of the central channel and of the subwoofer. The additional channels appeared due to a new 4-channel AC'97 codec (STAC9708) which replaced a dual-channel one (STAC9721 or CT1297). The Platinum 5.1 came with an updated version of the Live! Drive IR with a remote control support. These cards were marketed as Sound Blaster Live! 5.1 Platinum, Sound Blaster Live! 5.1 Gamer and Sound Blaster Live! 5.1 MP3+

It was possible to modify the generation 2 cards to offer 5.1 output by re-programing the 8-pin PROM chip (EEPROM 93c46). This was done by changing the Subsystem ID to one found on the generation 3 base audio controller .

A number of outside parties has released free drivers for the Sound Blaster Live! cards e.g. kxproject. These Drivers offer more control over the DSP.

For details on the original Live! including the Gold edition, marketing strategy, and design faults, see Sound Blaster Live! (Original)

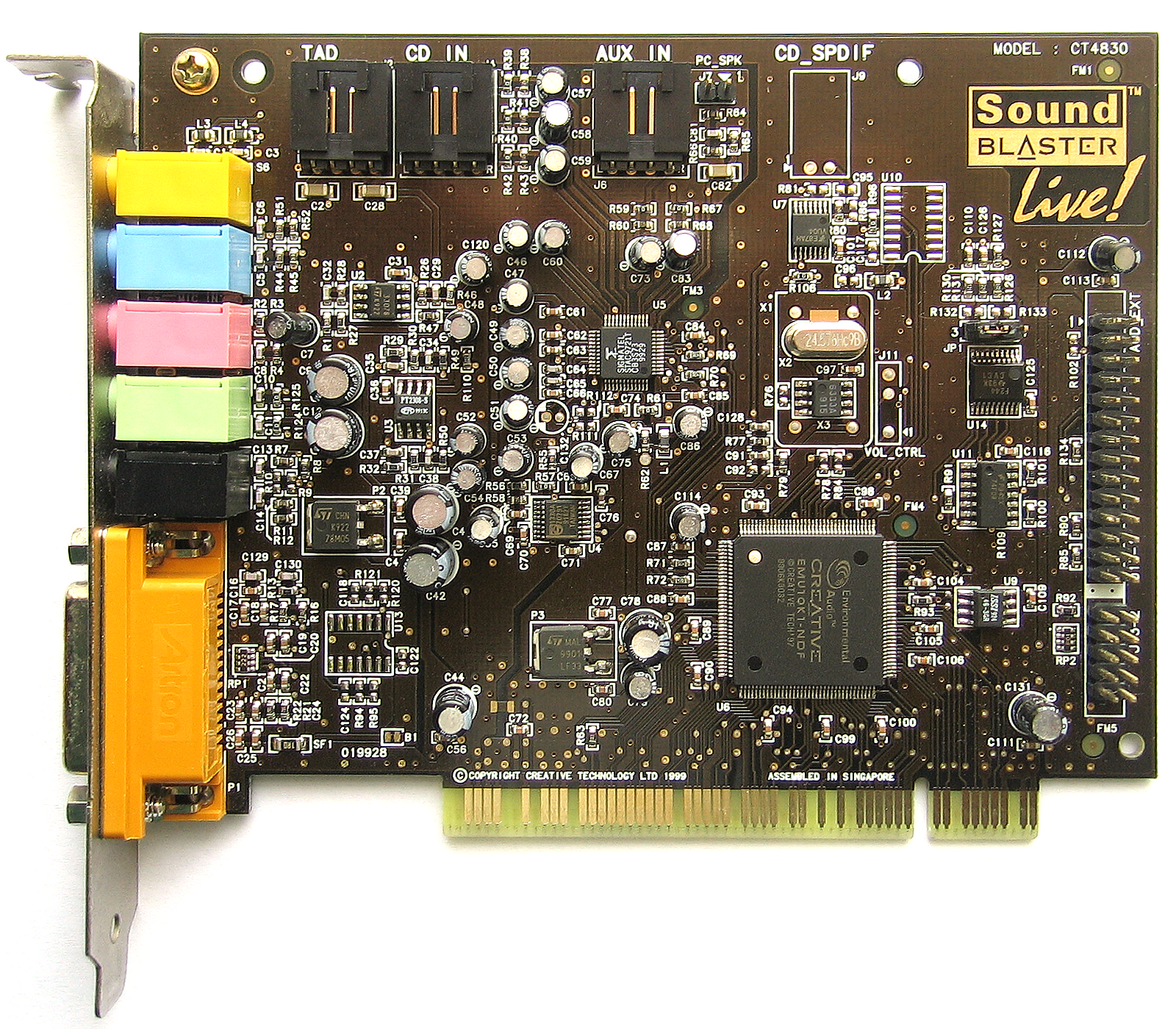
Creative Sound Blaster Live! 1024 soundcard upper view (chips)

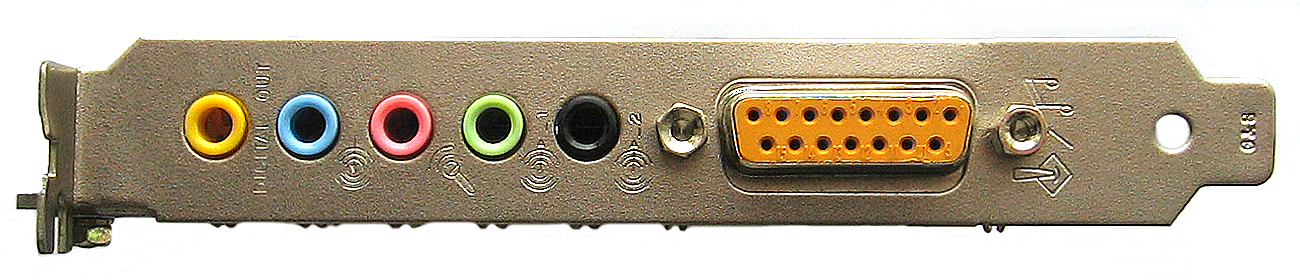
Creative Sound Blaster Live! 1024 soundcard side view (connectors)

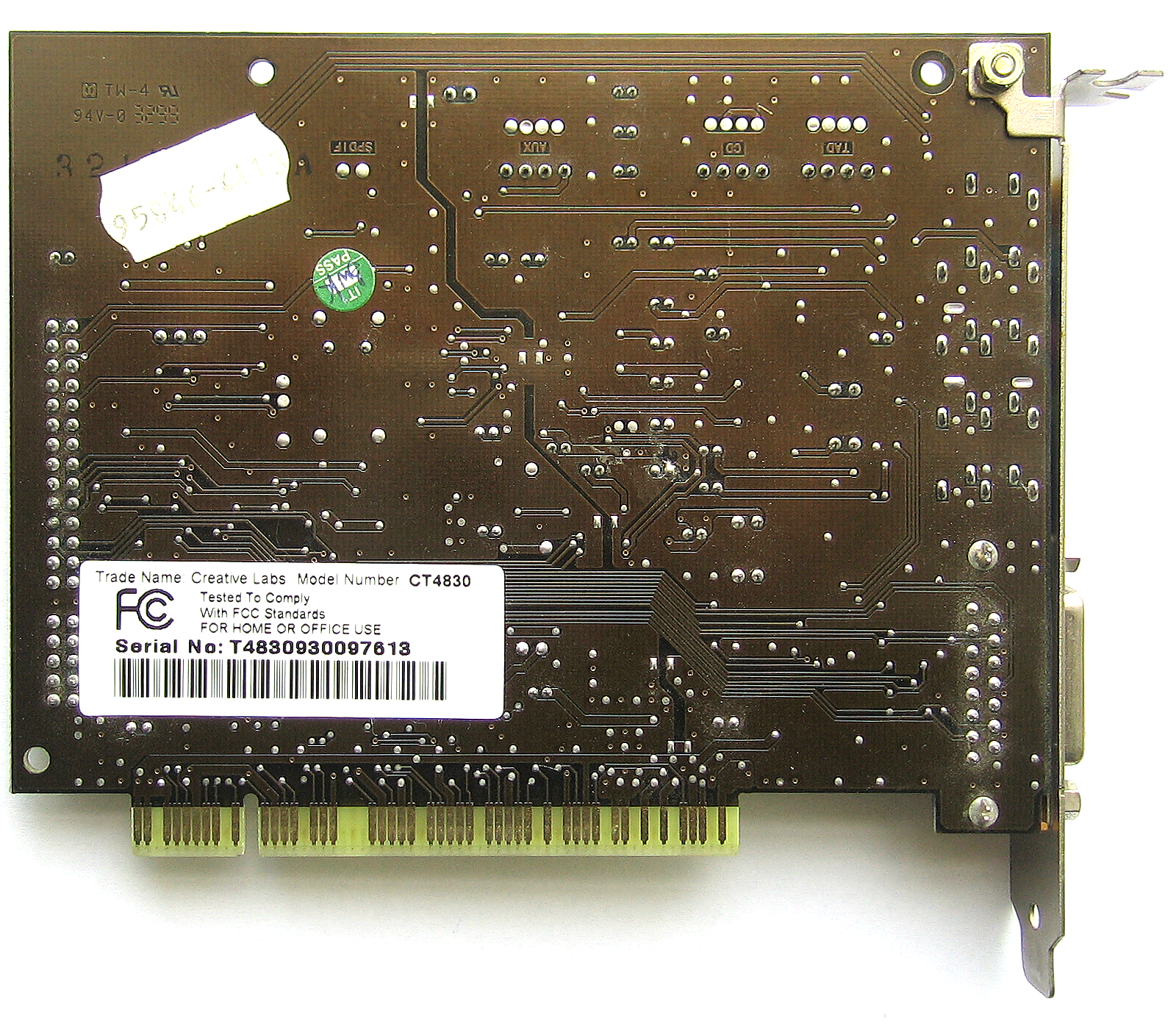
Creative Sound Blaster Live! 1024 soundcard back view (soldering)

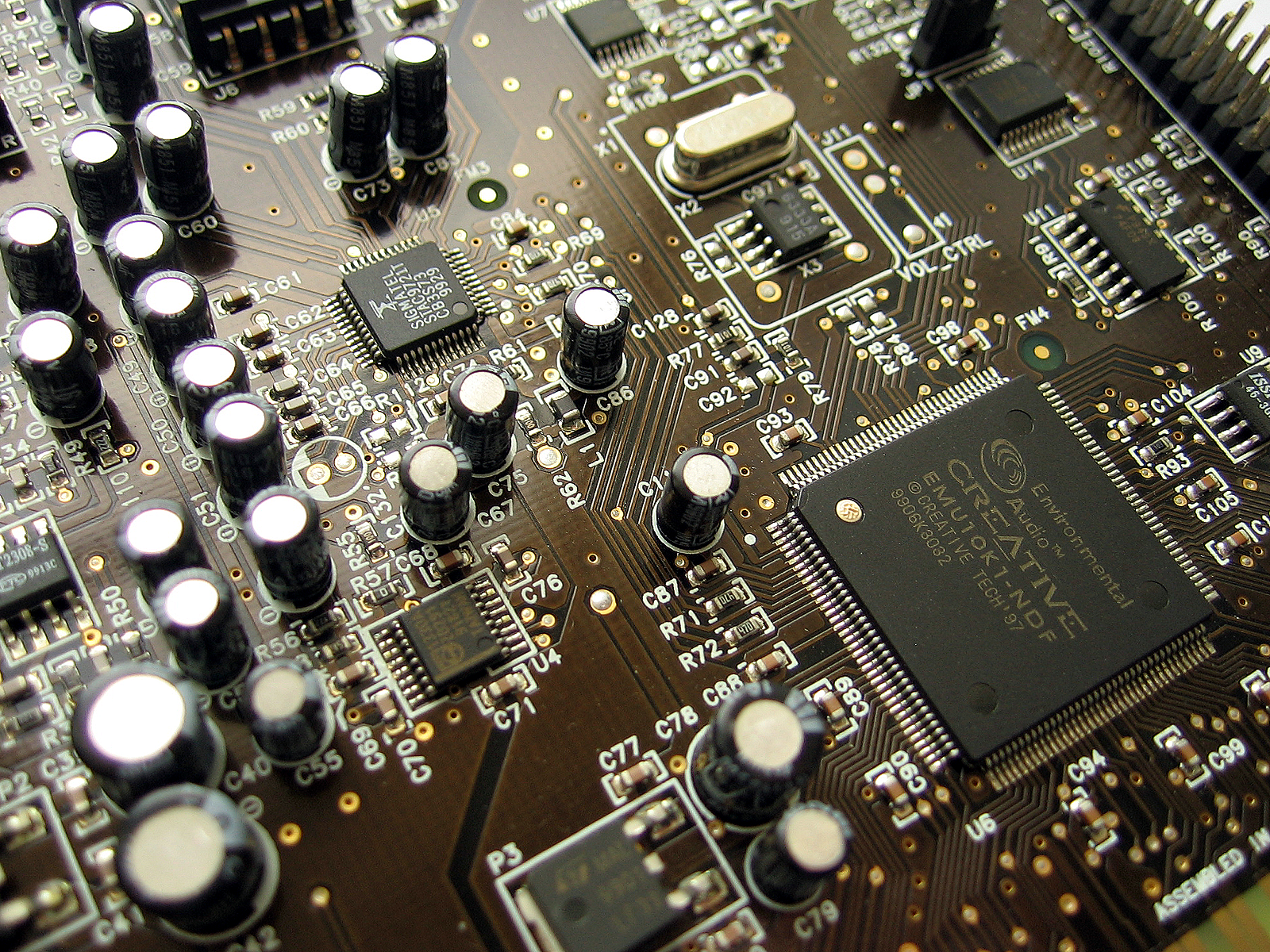
Creative Sound Blaster Live! 1024 soundcard 3D view with chips

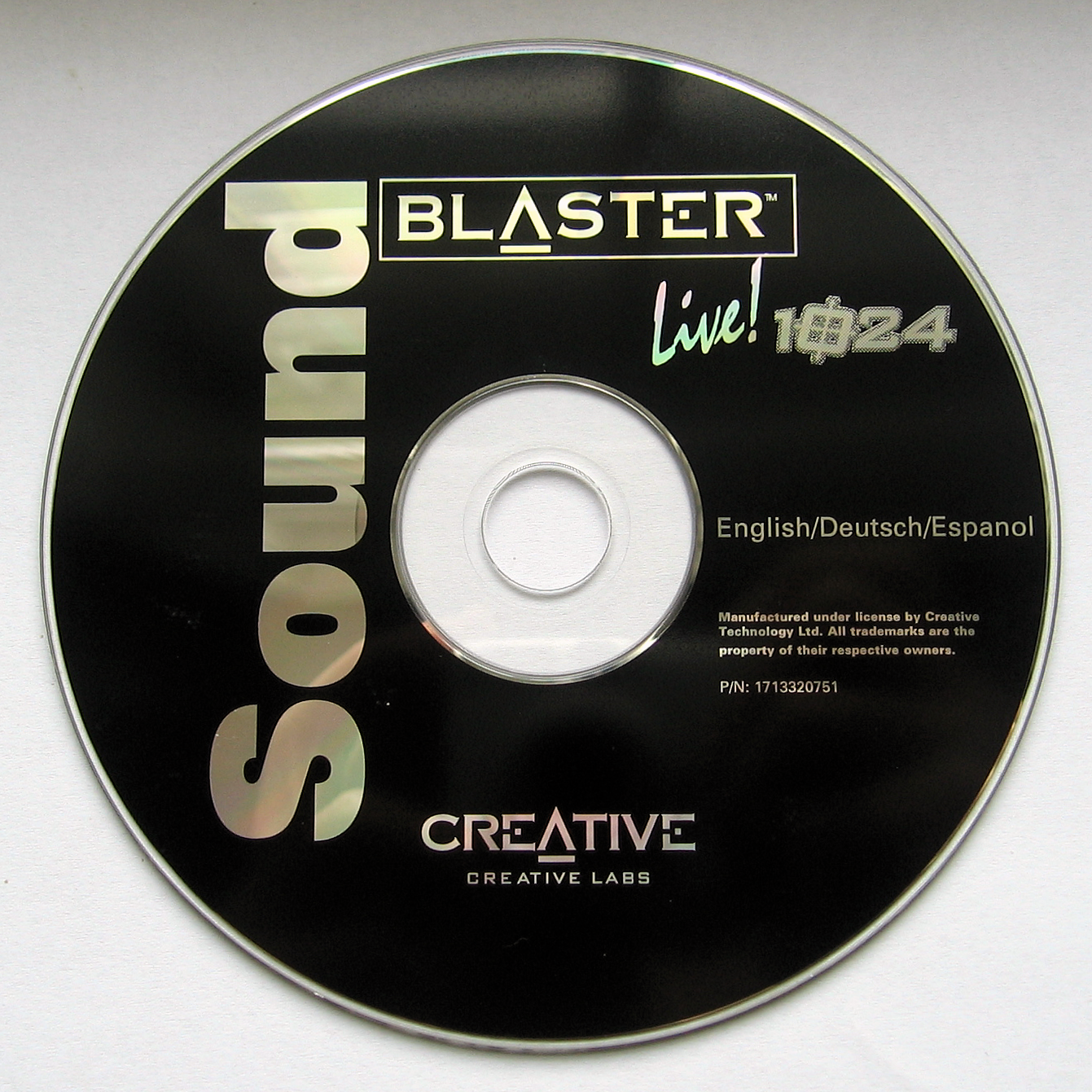
Driver CD of Sound Blaster Live! 1024 sound card

=== Sound Blaster Live! Platinum ===
Released 1999. Includes Live! Drive IR.

=== Sound Blaster Live! 5.1 and Sound Blaster Live! Platinum 5.1 ===
Released 2000. Live! with added outputs for a center channel speaker and LFE subwoofer channel. This minijack is shared and provide the C+LFE channels in analog mode; otherwise, when Digital Out is activated this minijack provide an S/PDIF coaxial output feature, with the ability of playback stereo or AC3 pass-thru. Not all models have this feature. Some well known models that support it are as follows: SB0060, SB0100, SB0102, SB0220. This mode must be activated in the sound mixer with "Digital Output Only" checkbox and is exclusive (not possible to use analog and digital at the same time).

=== Sound Blaster Live! (Dell OEM, CT4780 and SB0200/0203) ===
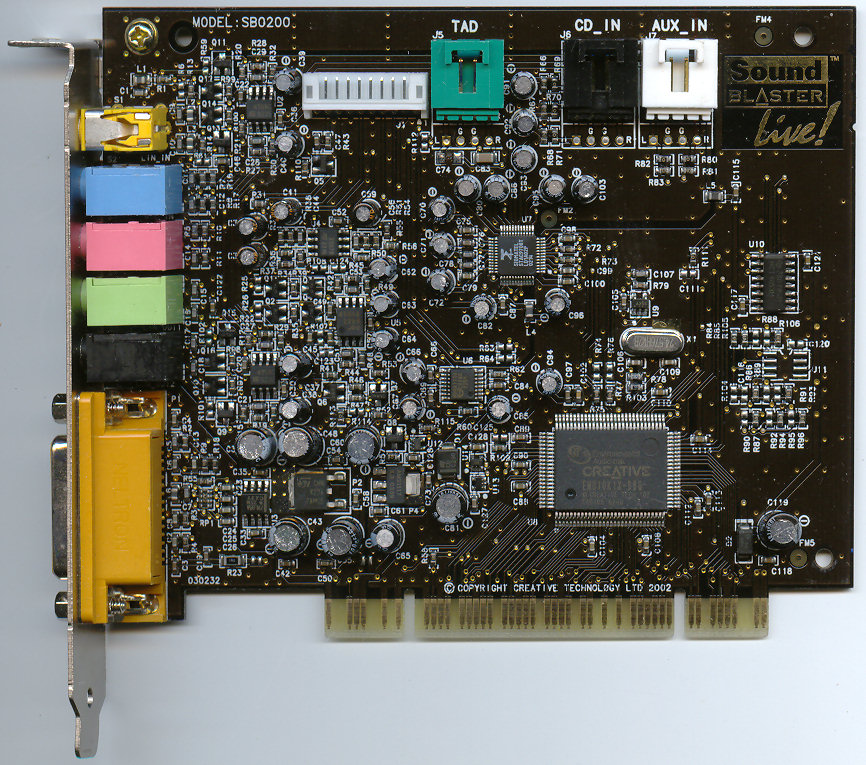
Sound Blaster Live! Dell OEM

This card, marketed as a Sound Blaster Live!, did not have the full capabilities of the retail versions of Live! It used a different audio chip, not EMU10K1 but EMU10K1X, that is noticeably smaller with fewer pins. The chip does not accelerate DirectSound in hardware, nor EAX. The sale of this board by Dell created some controversy because it was not obviously marketed as an inferior or cheaper product. The card can be identified by its part number (SB0200/0203).

There is also another Dell OEM card that Creative produced, the card is based on regular Sound Blaster Live! value card (CT4780) but can be distinguished by having a white connector for a front panel audio header for Dell PCs. When compared to CT4780, the Dell specific CT4780 had a different internal connector arrangement (the unpopulated I2S_IN connector on CT4780 was removed and effectively replaced by Dells front panel header). This card is based on Generation 2 of Sound Blaster Live! cards and uses EMU10K1-SFF or EMU10K1-JFF audio processor.

=== Sound Blaster Live! 5.1 Digital (Dell OEM, SB0220) ===
This was a later, improved model. The EMU10K1 chip was restored, as was hardware EAX/DirectSound/DirectSound3D acceleration. Currently there are Windows drivers available for download from Creative's website (filename: (Dell) Driver Install Pack 2_10 Languages). It was recommended that recording should be done at 48 kHz sampling rate, as there was an issue with hardware downsampling.

=== Sound Blaster Live! 24-bit ===
The Sound Blaster Live! 24-bit (SB0410) was not actually a member of the Sound Blaster Live! family, because it lacked the EMU10k1/10k2 processor. It was a stripped-down version of the Audigy Value, with an SNR of 100 dB, software based EAX, no advanced resolution DVD-Audio Playback, and no Dolby Digital 5.1 or Dolby Digital EX 6.1 playback. Evidence for this is that on Linux operating systems, when using the ALSA sound system, the module that is used for the Sound Blaster Live! 24-bit is snd-ca0106, while the module that is used by the Sound Blaster Live! is snd-emu10k1.

=== E-MU APS (Audio Production Studio) ===
This was a series of professional sound cards made by E-mu which was owned by Creative and had developed the EMU10K1 DSP chip featured on Creative's Live! products. Based on the later EMU10K2 chip, model numbers include 0404, 1212, 1616, and 1820. Their professional features included effects with higher quality, front-mounted drive bay panel with headphone output, dual mic/line inputs with physical level control knobs, digital coax in/out on both PCI card and drive bay, mixer with dB precision, phantom power for microphones (12V), ASIO, mixer presets, internal mixer rerouting, 64 MIDI channels, 32MB system RAM usage for SF2 (Gigabyte expandable in Windows XP) and future expandability through an extra multi-out card. They also featured line in and line out; all analogue inputs and outputs were balanced ¼"/6.3mm TRS jacks.

== See also ==
- Sound Blaster
