= SB1394 =

Creative Labs implementation of IEEE 1394 FireWire

SB1394 is Creative Labs implementation of IEEE 1394 interface (also known as i.Link or FireWire) and was included on the Sound Blaster Audigy and Audigy 2 family of sound cards.

Also OEM Audigy card with model number SB0090 is often referred as "Audigy SB1394".
