= Sound Blaster AWE64 =

Sound card from Creative Technology

Sound Blaster Advanced Wave Effects 64 is an ISA sound card from Creative Technology. It is an add-on board for IBM PC compatibles. The card was launched in November 1996.

== Overview ==
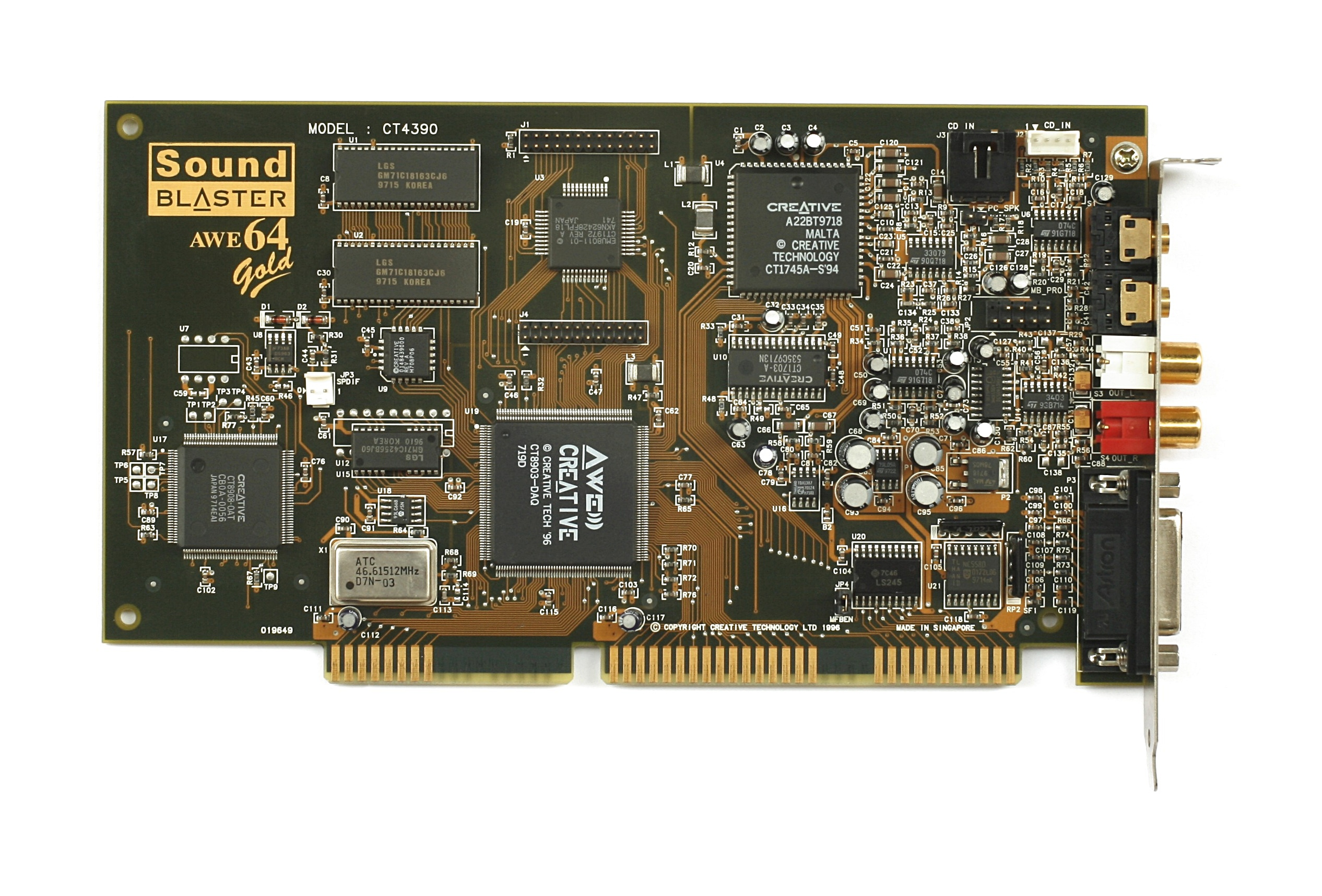
Sound Blaster AWE64 Gold.

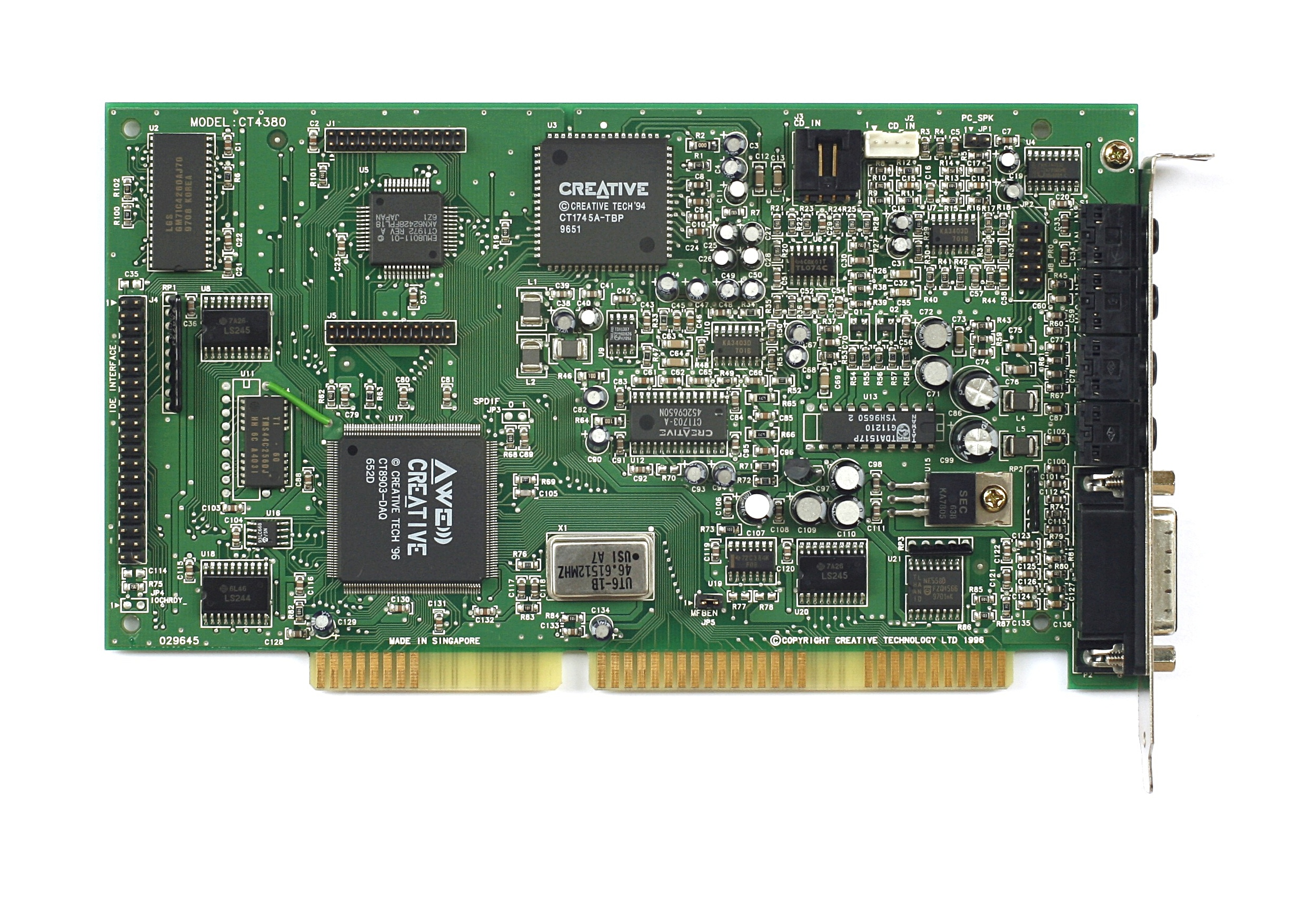
Sound Blaster AWE64 Value.

The Sound Blaster AWE64 is significantly smaller than its predecessor, the Sound Blaster AWE32. It offers a similar feature set, but also has a few notable improvements.

AWE64 has support for greater polyphony than the AWE32. Unfortunately, these additional voices are achieved via software-based processing on the system CPU. The technology, called WaveGuide, synthesizes the instrument sounds rather than using stored instrument patches like the hardware voices. This not only demands more processing power from the host system, but also is not of equal quality to available SoundFonts. The inability to adjust synthesis parameters, unlike with the hardware portion of the AWE64, also limited the WaveGuide function's usefulness.

Another improvement comes from better on-board circuitry that increases the signal-to-noise ratio and overall signal quality compared to the frequently quite noisy AWE32 and Sound Blaster 16 boards. This improvement is most notable with the AWE64 Gold, because of its superior gold plated RCA connector outputs. The improvement also comes from increased integration of components on AWE64 compared to its predecessors. Increased integration means the board can be simpler and trace routing to components is reduced, decreasing the amount of noise-inducing signal travel. This also made it possible to reduce the size of AWE64's board noticeably, compared to AWE32.

The Sound Blaster AWE32 boards allowed sample RAM expansion through the installation of 30-pin fast-page DRAM SIMMs. These SIMMs were commodity items during the time of AWE32 and AWE64, because they were used for many other applications, including plain system RAM. As such, Creative had no control over their sale. So, with the AWE64, Creative moved to proprietary RAM expansion modules which only they manufactured and sold. These memory boards were priced rather high. Their limited production also has made it quite difficult to expand an AWE64's RAM capacity since the AWE64 left production.

AWE64, in the end, was basically a revision of the AWE32. Quality of components and output was improved and cost of manufacturing was lessened. Functionality of the hardware was nearly identical. The boards were based around the AWE32's E-mu 8000 sample-based synthesis chipset, E-mu effects processor, and a Creative audio DSP and codec for digital sound playback.

== Variants ==
The AWE64 came in two versions initially: A standard version, later re-branded as Value (with 512 KB of RAM), and a Gold version (with 4 MB of RAM, high quality 20-bit DAC and a separate SPDIF output). The earlier revision of the standard and value versions of the card (i.e. Model CT4500) had all-black jacks, but a later revision (model CT4520) had color coded jacks. The CT4500 also didn't come with an IDE connector for a CD-ROM which was common for sound cards at the time.

A third version that arrived later, was designed around the PCI bus. It offers the features of the original ISA AWE64, but it has the PCI interface and is built around an even more integrated ASIC. This made the board even more compact, and thus cheaper to build. Unfortunately, during this card's time, the issue of compatibility with older legacy DOS applications accessing PCI audio cards had not been ideally addressed. Creative created a motherboard port called the SB-Link that assisted the PCI bus in working with software that looked for the legacy I/O resources of ISA sound cards. Without this motherboard port, the card was incompatible with DOS software.

AWE64 PCI was later followed by the AWE64D, which was a variant of the PCI AWE64 that was developed for OEMs. It again offered the same feature support as other AWE64 cards, including the DOS support issues. The AWE64D was not quite compatible with AWE64 PCI drivers, however, and had to use separate driver packages.

An AWE64 Mark II was also designed, and prototype boards and drivers made. This card added 4 speaker surround sound for games, and a hardware Dolby Digital decoder. The six extra phono plugs (sub, center, left rear, right rear, digital in, digital pass-through) and the extra Dolby decoder chips were placed on a second board which connected to the main board via a ribbon cable. The project was dropped in favor of the Sound Blaster Live! cards due to the high expense of such a solution, and the aging ISA interface.

== AWE-SIMM ==
In response to Creative's move towards a proprietary memory module, Jeff Briden created an adapter board that plugged into the AWE64 and allowed the user to install normal 30-pin SIMMs. The AWE-SIMM was available for several years starting in 1998 but is no longer available.

== SIMMConn ==
In 1998, Beijing Luck Star Power Machines Co, Ltd. had designed an adapter board named SIMMConn that could be plugged into AWE64 and allowed to install a single 72-pin SIMM module. The adapter came in two variants: SIMMConn Value – designed for AWE64 and AWE64 Value, and SIMMConn Gold – designed for AWE64 Gold. Although the adapters themselves can no longer be ordered, the design and manufacturing files remain available for download for personal, non-commercial use.

As of 2020, Serdaco (Belgium) produces a clone of the SIMMConn.

== See also ==
- Sound Blaster
- Ensoniq AudioPCI
- Seer Systems (Creative WaveSynth)
