= El Matador (video game) =

2006 video game

- Developer: Plastic Reality Technologies
- Publishers: Cenega Publishing; 1C Company (Steam)
- Platform: Microsoft Windows
- Release: EU: September 8, 2006; AU: September 28, 2006; NA: September 29, 2006
- Genre: Third-person shooter
- Mode: Single-player

El Matador is a 2006 third-person shooter video game developed by Czech studio Plastic Reality Technologies and published by Cenega Publishing.

== Gameplay ==
The player controls DEA agent Victor Corbet who fights the narkomafia in Colombia. The game uses the same engine as Max Payne 2. The player can use bullet time and perform shootdodges while aiming, and it is possible to dual-wield guns. This game has realistic physics and a partially destructible environment.

The game features boss battles, with the bosses being highlighted with a health meter beneath their portrait. They take more damage than the average enemy, move faster and deal more damage towards the player.

== Plot ==
After a successful raid to rescue a DA's daughter in a nightclub owned by drug lord Alberto Entiendez, Victor Corbet is sent to Colombia to assist the local police in taking down La Valedora Cartel, who were involved in a massacre that killed Victor's brother. The police department includes Captain Carlos Enterrador, ADA Mia Rodriguez, Sgt. Gabriel Montego and Ricardo "Rico" Altemetra, a close friend of Victor.

Victor's first assignment consists of eavesdropping a secret meeting of the Cartel in Hotel Paradiso, Bogota, hosted by drug lord nicknamed "El Corsario". During the meeting, Victor's team is attacked by the Cartel, leaving Victor the only survivor. Victor raids the Hotel on his own and kills "El Corsario", but the remaining leaders of La Valedora escape by helicopter.

Due to Victor's heroic actions at the hotel, he is nicknamed "El Matador" by his comrades. Rico and Victor are sent to raid an abandoned factory which serves as a secret drug factory for La Valedora. Victor and Rico are tasked with arresting Guillermo Toro, a drug kingpin who is controlling the operations. During the raid, Victor manages to destroy the factory with C-4, but Toro escapes. Victor and the rest of the team corner Toro in a church, and in the ensuing shootout Toro is heavily wounded before being executed by Captain Enterrador.

The police finds out that La Valedora has a training camp in Colombia's jungle, run by a former Israeli agent. Due to Enterrador's distrust of the police force, he orders Victor to go in alone to kill all hostile forces.

Thanks to information retrieved by Victor, the DEA finds out that the leader of La Valedora is Helmut Koch, a former SS soldier who lives in an island fortress. The DEA, with Victor and Montego leading the team, raids the island. Victor kills Koch in a gunfight.

Documents found in Koch's lair reveal that a big drug cargo is being transported in a freighter. Enterrador gathers all police forces to retrieve the cargo, instead of destroying it. During the raid, Rico is shot and killed by an unknown assailant. Victor backfires on him and unmasks him, revealing the assailant to be Montego. Montego reveals to Victor that Enterrador intends to steal the cargo for himself before dying from his wounds.

Victor, with the help of Mia, raids the freighter, where Enterrador and several of his Special Ops men are gathered. Victor manages to kill all of his men before wounding Enterrador. Enterrador justifies all of his actions to Victor, claiming that the justice he served is controlled by men worse than the drug lords he has been fighting. Enterrador pulls out a concealed pistol and the screen turns to black and a gunshot is heard.

A mid-credits title card reveals that Mia was promoted after the downfall of the Cartel, and Victor is now working as an international observer in Asia.

== Reception ==
Reception

Aggregate score
Aggregator	Score
Metacritic	54/100

Review scores
Publication	Score
1Up.com	C
Computer Games Magazine	1/5
Eurogamer	4/10
GameSpot	5.1/10
GameZone	5/10
IGN	5.3/10
PC Format	64%
PC Zone	43%
VideoGamer.com	6/10

The game received "mixed" reviews according to the review aggregation website Metacritic.
