= Sound Blaster Audigy =

Computer sound card

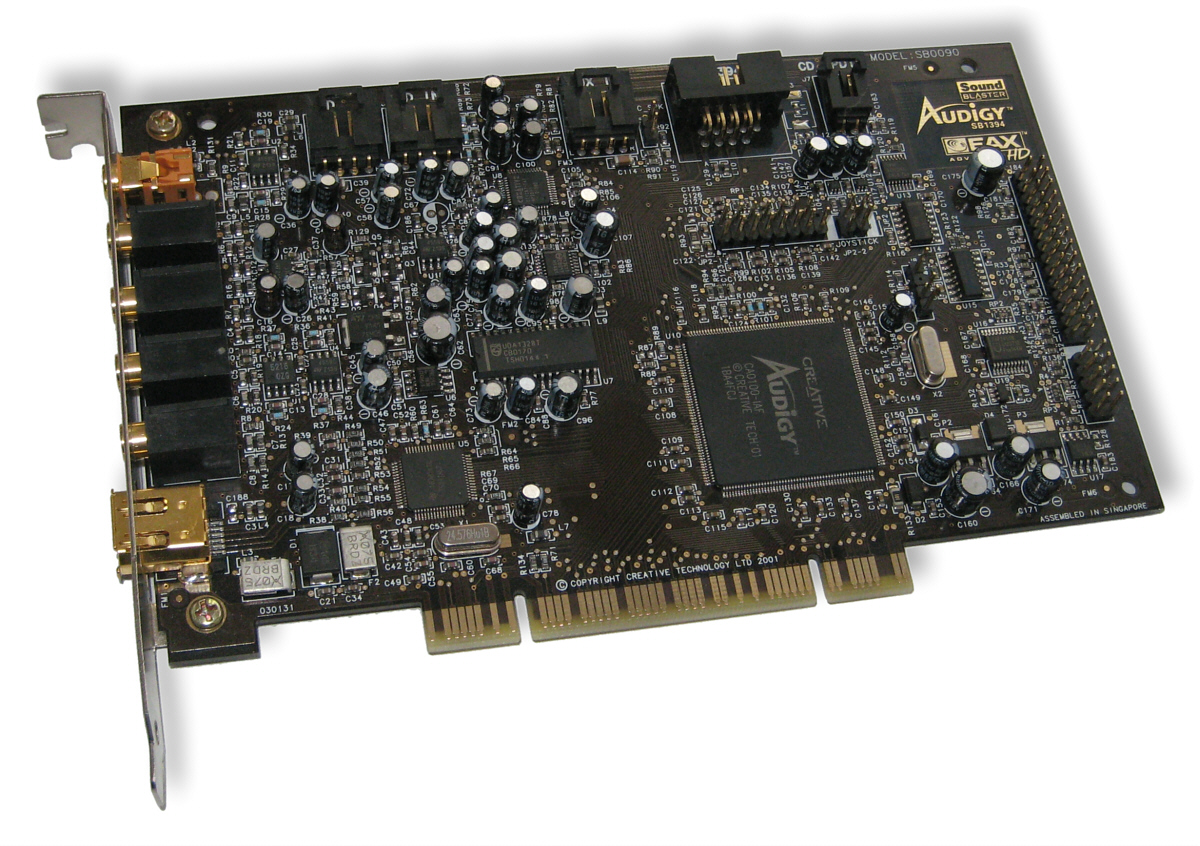
Sound Blaster Audigy Player

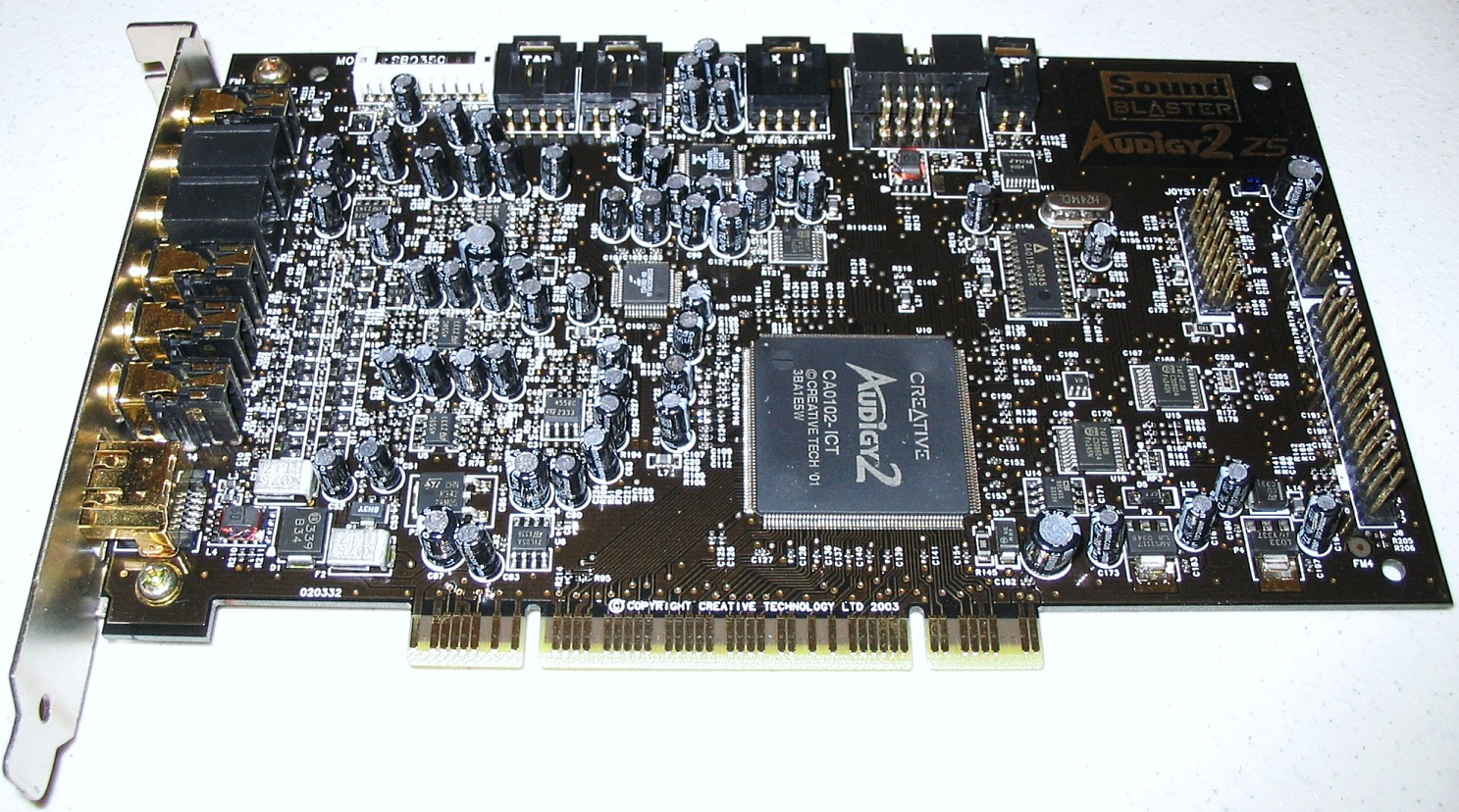
Sound Blaster Audigy 2 ZS Gold

Sound Blaster Audigy is a product line of sound cards from Creative Technology. The flagship model of the Audigy family used the EMU10K2 audio DSP, an improved version of the SB-Live's EMU10K1, while the value/SE editions were built with a less-expensive audio controller.

The Audigy family is available for PCs with a PCI or PCI Express slot, or a USB port.

== First generation ==
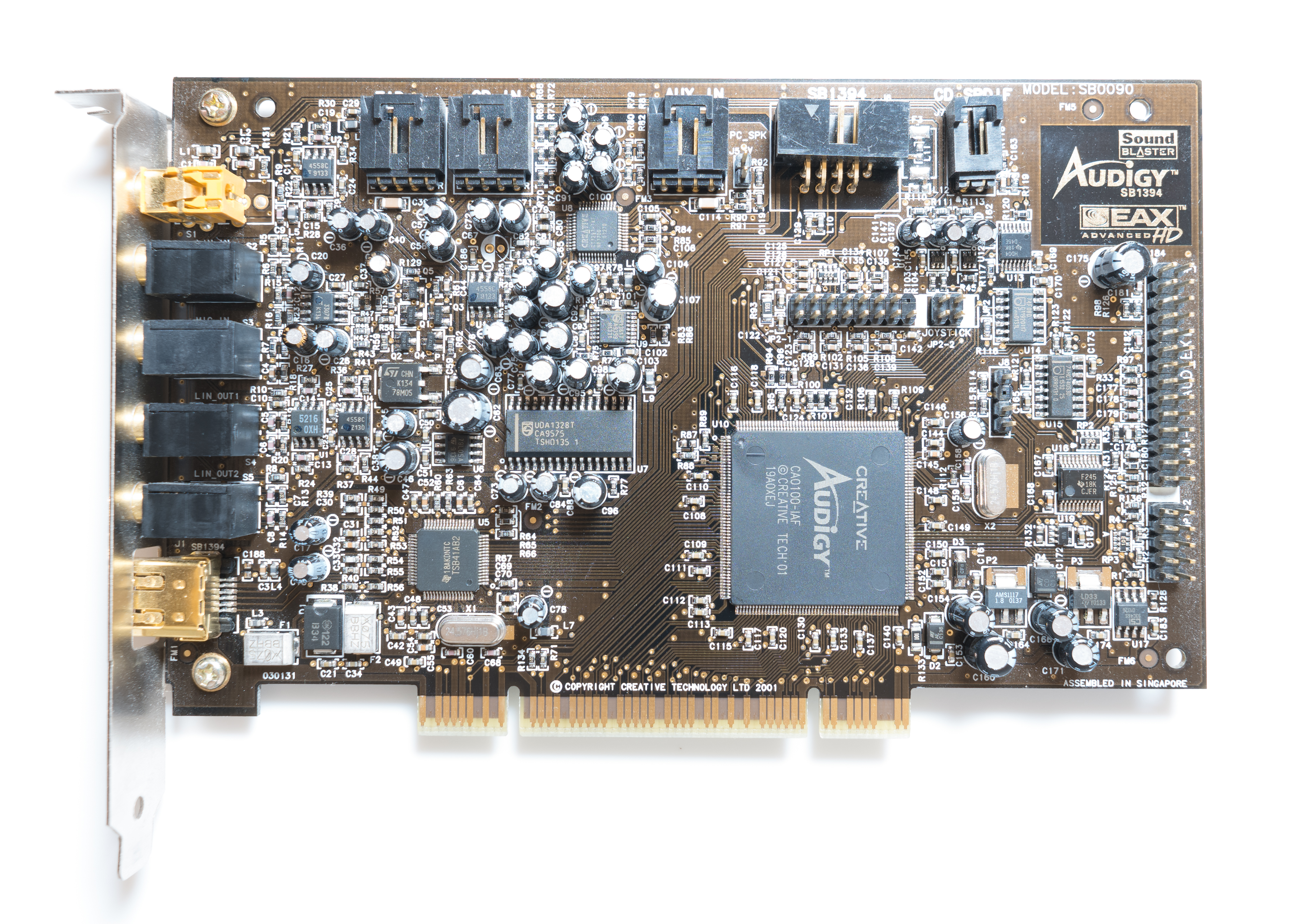
A first generation Audigy card

Die shot of the EMU10K2 (CA0100) chip

The Audigy cards equipped with EMU10K2 (CA0100 chip) could process up to 4 EAX environments simultaneously with its on-chip DSP and native EAX 3.0 ADVANCED HD support, and supported from stereo up to 5.1-channel output. The audio processor could mix up to 64 DirectSound3D sound channels in hardware, up from Live!'s 32 channels.

Creative Labs advertised the Audigy as a 24-bit sound card, a controversial marketing claim for a product that did not support end-to-end playback of 24-bit/96 kHz audio streams. The Audigy and Live shared a similar architectural limitation: the audio transport (DMA engine) was fixed to 16-bit sample precision at 48 kHz. So despite its 24-bit/96 kHz high-resolution DACs, the Audigy's DSP could only process 16-bit/48 kHz audio sources. This fact was not immediately obvious in Creative's literature, and was difficult to ascertain even upon examination of the Audigy's spec sheets. (A resulting class-action settlement with Creative later awarded US customers a 35% discount on Creative products, up to a maximum discount of $65.)

Aside from the lack of an end-to-end path for 24-bit audio, Dolby Digital (AC-3) and DTS passthrough (to the S/PDIF digital out) had issues that have never been resolved.

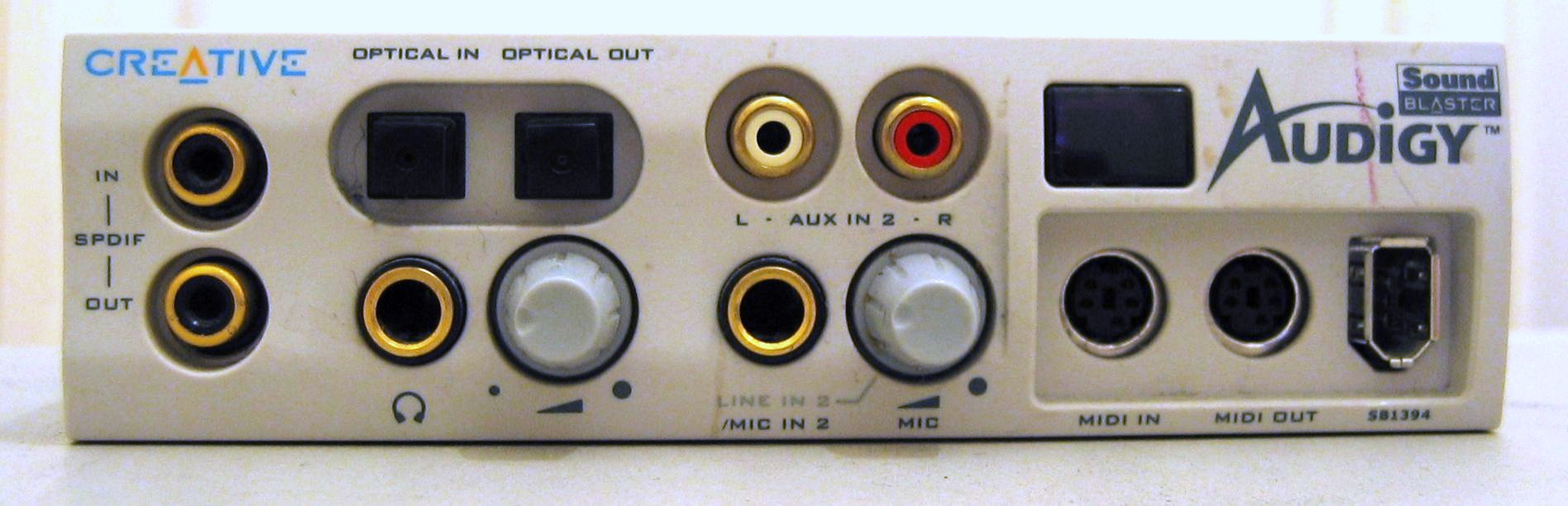
First generation break out box

Audigy card supports the professional ASIO 1 driver interface natively, making it possible to obtain low latencies from Virtual Studio Technology (VST) instruments. Some versions of Audigy featured an external break out box with connectors for S/PDIF, MIDI, IEEE 1394, analog and optical signals. The ASIO and break out box features were an attempt to tap into the "home studio" market, with a mainstream product.

=== Sound Blaster Audigy ES ===
This variant (SB0160) uses the full EMU10K2 chip (CA0100 chip) and is, as a result, quite similar in feature set. It is only missing its FireWire port.

=== Sound Blaster Audigy SE & Audigy Value ===
The Audigy SE (SB0570) and Audigy Value (SB0570) are stripped down models, with a less expensive CA0106 audio-controller in place of the EMU10k2. With the CA0106, the SE/Value are limited to software-based EAX 3.0 (upgraded to software-based EAX 4.0 with a driver update), no advanced resolution DVD-Audio Playback, and no Dolby Digital 5.1 or Dolby Digital EX 6.1 playback. With these cards only one of the mic, line in, or AUX sources may be unmuted at a time. The Audigy SE and Audigy Value both carry the SB0570 model number. It is possible that the same card was sold in different markets with different names, that perhaps the cards were sold with one name for a while and later it was changed or it's possible they could even be slightly different cards.

The SE is a low-profile PCI card in the Audigy family, and still has many unsold units at online retailers unlike the other Audigy cards.

Sound quality

Wavetable
64-voice synthesizer

Audio path
Analog-Digital Converter (ADC): 24 bit @ 96 kHz
Digital-Analog Converter (DAC): 24 bit @ 96 kHz
recording: 16‥24 bit @ 8, 11.025, 16, 22.05, 24, 32, 44.1, 48, 96 kHz

Digital path
S/PDIF: 24 bit @ 44.1, 48, 96 kHz

Sound channels
Analog: 2.1, 4.1, 5.1, 6.1, 7.1 and Creative Multi Speaker Surround (CMSS) which means that Audigy SE 7.1 cards can upmix mono or stereo sources to 7.1 channels.
Digital: 2.1

=== Sound Blaster Audigy LS ===
The Sound Blaster Audigy LS (SB0310) is similar to the Audigy SE in that it supports neither hardware acceleration nor FireWire.

=== Sound Blaster Audigy Platinum EX ===
The Sound Blaster Audigy Platinum EX (SB0090) is similar to the Audigy ES, but supported an external break out box instead of the standard internal version. It came with a Firewire port and was introduced before the AS models.

=== Sound Blaster Audigy VX ===
The VX (SB0060) is a low-profile PCI card in the Audigy family.

== Second generation ==
=== Sound Blaster Audigy 2 series ===
==== Sound Blaster Audigy 2 ====
The Sound Blaster Audigy 2 (SB0240) (September 2002) featured an updated EMU10K2 processor called CA0102 to gain access to CA0151 which is a separate chip. Collectively CA0102 and CA0151 was sometimes referred to as EMU10K2.5 (The CA0102 chip alone is just a version of Emu10k2). To address the biggest shortcoming of the original Audigy, a revised DMA engine allowed end-to-end high-resolution (24-bit) audio playback: 96 kHz 6.1 channel recording, and 192 kHz stereo. However, the high-resolution audio was achieved by bypassing the DSP, being decoded directly by CA0151 chip also known as "p16v" to take advantage of which Creative substituted CA0102 for the old CA0100 used in Audigy 1. Using the DSP with high-resolution audiostreams resulted in the Audigy's characteristic downsampling (to the DSP's native-rate of 48 kHz), for mixing with other audio sources.

Use of Windows Vista or 7 should mitigate the DSP sample rate conversion issue as setting the card to 16-bit/48 kHz resamples audio using the much superior 32-bit float Windows audio stack before sending it to the card. It is unclear whether this works for all use cases (e.g. OpenAL).

The Audigy 2 supported up to 6.1 speakers and had improved signal-to-noise ratio (SNR) over the Audigy (106 vs. 100 decibels (A)). Audio output was supplied by the AC'97 codec on the front outputs and I²S on the rear. It also featured built-in Dolby Digital Surround EX decoding for improved DVD play-back. An IEEE 1394 (FireWire) connector was present in all modifications except Value.

Audigy 2's 3D audio capabilities received a boost when compared to its predecessors. Creative created the EAX 4.0 ADVANCED HD standard to coincide with Audigy 2's release. The chip again can process up to 64 DirectSound3D audio channels in hardware. It also has native support for the free and open source OpenAL audio API.

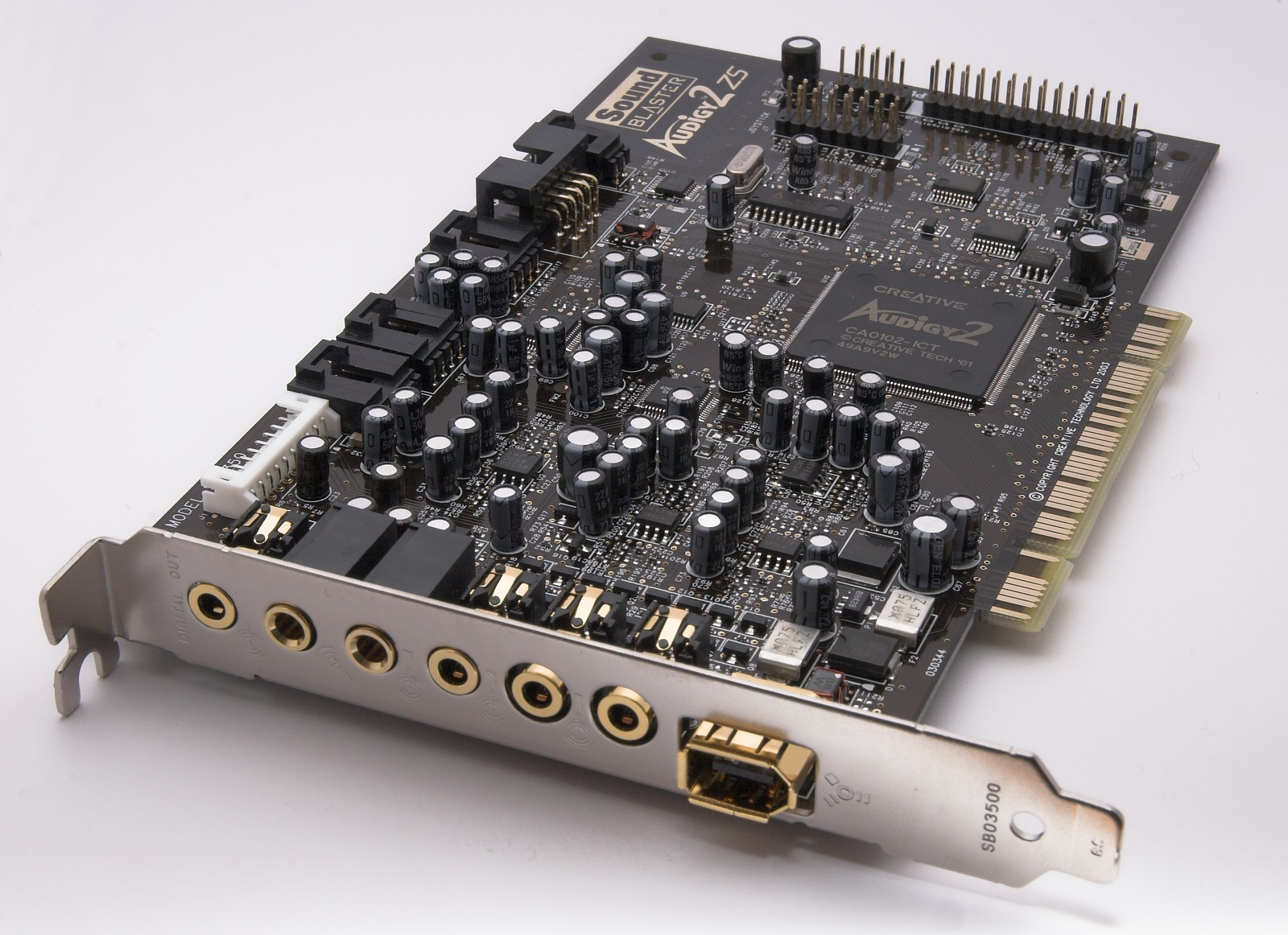
Sound Blaster Audigy 2 ZS Gold

==== Sound Blaster Audigy 2 ZS series ====
===== Sound Blaster Audigy 2 ZS =====
The Sound Blaster Audigy 2 ZS (SB0350) was a revision of the Audigy 2 with a slightly improved signal-to-noise ratio (108 vs. 106 dB) and DTS-ES (Extended Surround) for DVD playback. The Audigy 2 ZS supports up to 7.1 speakers via 4-pole mini-jacks, although it used a non-conventional pin out: Side R/L are on Line Out 2/3, respectively.

Most widespread card of Audigy series. Unofficial drivers for 32 and 64-bit editions of Windows 10 / 8.x / 7 / Vista SP2 / XP SP3 are available.

IRIX has drivers for the Sound Blaster Audigy 2 ZS and it can be installed into the SGI Fuel series of workstations.

There was also a cardbus version of the ZS for use with notebook computers.

The PC cards earned the distinction of being the first computer sound cards to be THX-certified.

Sound Blaster Audigy 2 ZS Platinum (SB0360)

The Platinum model includes an audio front panel, called Platinum Drive, which provides various multimedia connections in addition to an Audigy 2 ZS card with the following specs:
Testing chain: External loopback (line-out1 - line-in3)
Sampling mode: 24-bit, 96 kHz
Measured values:

- Noise level, dB (A): -101.3
- THD, %: 0.0034
- IMD, %: 0.0080
- Stereo crosstalk, dB: -91.8

Sound Blaster Audigy 2 ZS Platinum Pro

The Platinum Pro model includes an external I/O Hub with various multimedia connections, sometimes erroneously called the Platinum Ex, in addition to an Audigy 2 ZS card with the following specs:
Testing chain: External loopback (line-out1 - line-in3)
Sampling mode: 24-bit, 96 kHz
Measured values:

- Noise level, dB (A): -104.3
- THD, %: 0.0015
- IMD, %: 0.0070
- Stereo crosstalk, dB: -103.2

===== Sound Blaster Audigy 2 ZS Notebook =====
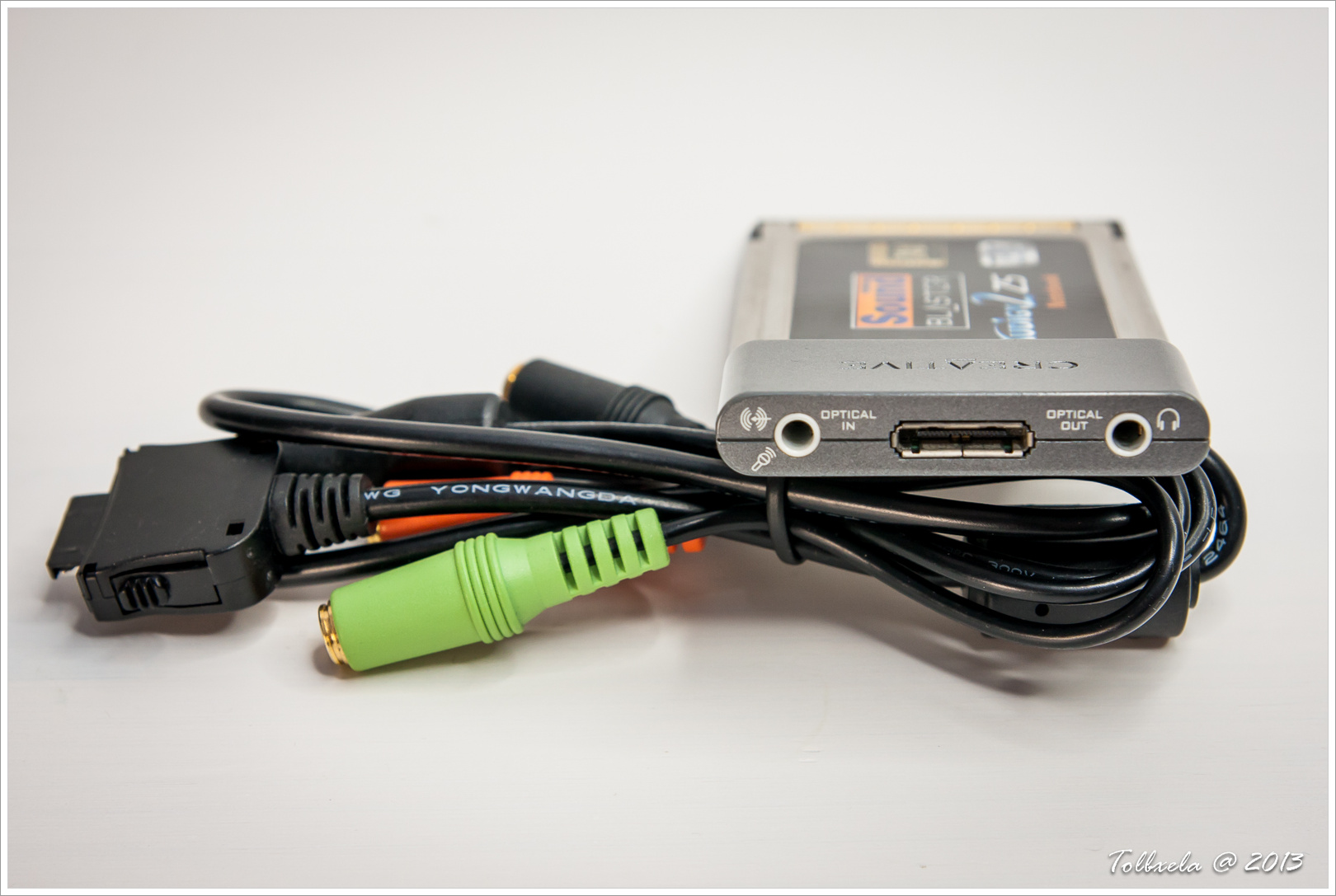
Sound Blaster Audigy 2 ZS Notebook

The Sound Blaster Audigy 2 ZS Notebook (SB0530) is a CardBus version of the Audigy 2 ZS released in Fall 2004 for the notebook market. It had nearly all of the capabilities of the PCI edition, but in a far smaller form factor. Reductions in capability included somewhat limited MIDI capability (compared to the PCI version) and the loss of FireWire. It was the first gaming-oriented sound hardware add-on board for notebooks that offered full hardware acceleration of 3D audio along with high-fidelity audio output quality. The card struggled with compatibility due to quality issues with the CardBus host chipsets in many notebooks of the time, a problem also suffered with other companies' products, such as Echo Digital Audio Corporation's Indigo.

===== Sound Blaster Audigy 2 ZS Video Editor =====
The Sound Blaster Audigy 2 ZS Video Editor (SB0480) was an external USB soundcard, which combined audio playback, accelerated video editing and a 4-port USB 2.0 hub in one solution. It featured accelerated video encoding with DoMiNoFX video processing technologies. The audio system provided THX certified sound and 24-bit EAX ADVANCED HD in 5.1 or 7.1 surround.

The video capture of the device is hardware-accelerated; encoding it to a complex format in real-time rather than using the CPU. While this results in good quality video even on basic systems, the device cannot be used by software that uses the standard DirectShow or VfW interface. Because of this limitation, the supplied software to capture video must be used. This prevents use of the device in conjunction with a video camera as a webcam, as standard webcam interfaces use DirectShow.

Creative has made the free VidCap application available on their website. It allows quick and easy capture and output to devices. Captured files can be imported into a video editor application or DVD authoring program.

==== Sound Blaster Audigy 2 Value ====
The Sound Blaster Audigy 2 Value (SB0400) was a somewhat stripped-down version of the Audigy 2 ZS - It uses EMU10K2.5 chip CA0108 which integrate CA0102 and CA0151 on a single piece of silicon but is a value version, with an SNR of 106 dB, no IEEE 1394 FireWire connector, and no DTS-ES 6.1 playback. It is, however, fully hardware accelerated for DirectSound and EAX 4 and was sold as a cheaper companion for the more expensive ZS.

==== Sound Blaster Audigy 2 SE ====
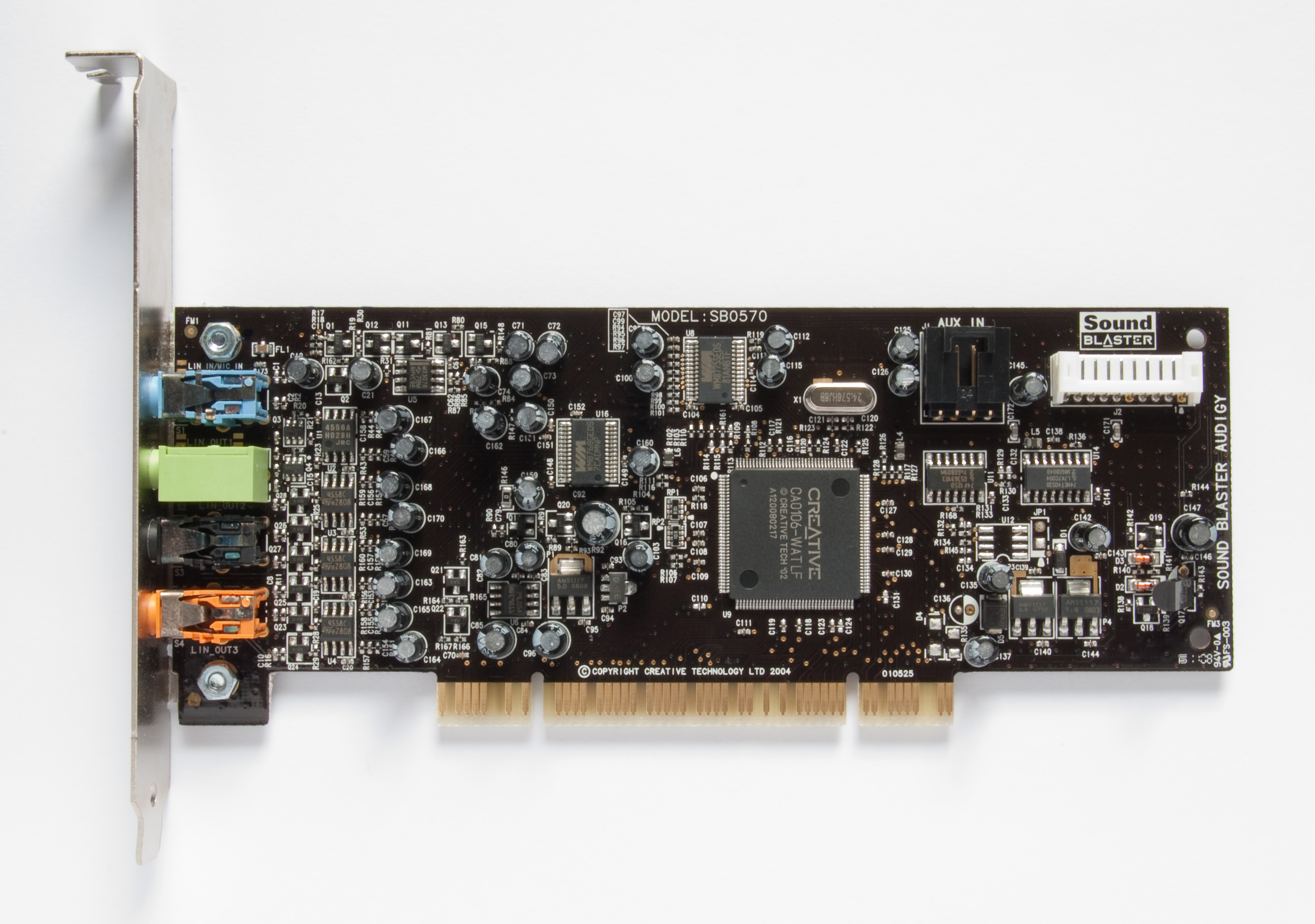
Sound Blaster Audigy 2 SE

The Sound Blaster Audigy 2 SE (SB0570) is similar to the Audigy SE and Live! 24-bit edition in that it does not have a hardware DSP as part of the audio chip. As such, it puts far more load on the host system's CPU. The card is physically smaller than other Audigy 2 cards. It is designed as an entry-level budget sound card.

==== Sound Blaster Audigy 2 NX ====
The Sound Blaster Audigy 2 NX (SB0300) was an external USB soundcard, supporting 24 bit playback, but with no DSP chip. (CA0186-EAT)

=== Sound Blaster Audigy HD Software Edition ===
Also known as Sound Blaster Audigy ADVANCED MB (SB060), it is similar to Audigy 2 SE, but the software supports EAX 3.0, which supports 64-channel software wavetable with DirectSound acceleration, but without hardware accelerated wavetable synthesis. DAC is rated 95 dB Signal-to-Noise Ratio.

It is available as an integrated option for Dell Inspiron, Studio and XPS notebooks.

Of note is that Creative hardware is not necessary for this device. It is entirely a software solution that is adaptable to various DACs.

=== Sound Blaster Audigy 4 series ===
==== Sound Blaster Audigy 4 ====
The Sound Blaster Audigy 4 (SB0610) uses CA10300 (CA0108's unleaded counterpart) DSP instead of the more advanced CA10200 (CA0102's unleaded counterpart) and does not have external hub, FireWire port or gold connectors. The board layout is similar to the Audigy 2 Value. The SNR is rated 106 dB.

==== Sound Blaster Audigy 4 Pro ====
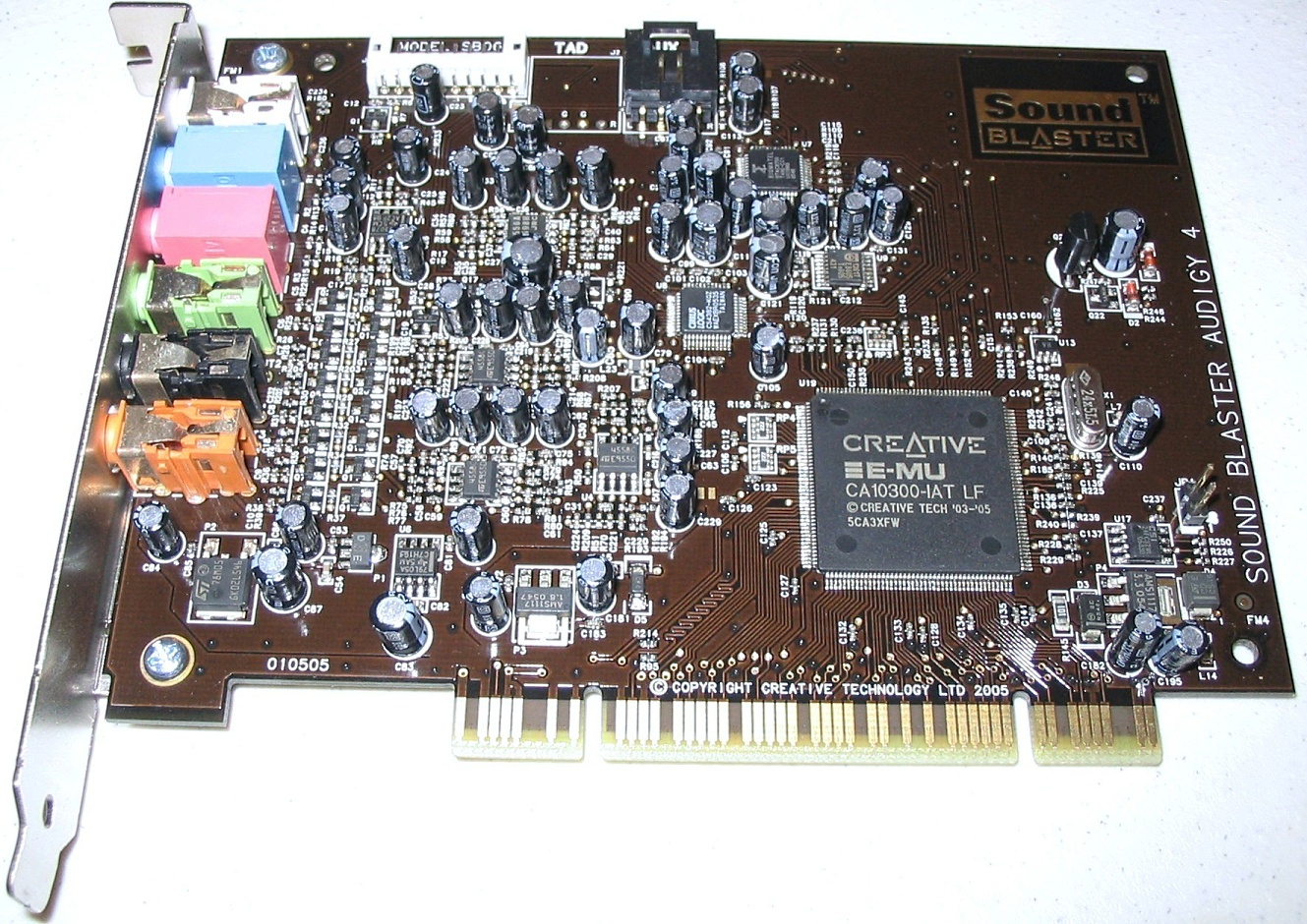
Sound Blaster Audigy 4

The Sound Blaster Audigy 4 Pro (SB0380) improves on the Sound Blaster Audigy 2 ZS by improving the SNR to 113 dB. It features much of the same core technology as the Audigy 2 ZS which uses the CA0102. The newer model uses a CA10200 which is unleaded instead, and a new external I/O hub which has superior DACs offering higher digital-to-analog audio conversion quality. It also allows for simultaneous recording of up to six audio channels in 96 kHz/24-bit. It still supports a maximum of 7.1 audio channels up to 96 kHz/24bit, and stereo output at 192 kHz/24bit. The 7.1 mode is only supported under Windows XP, as well as 6.1 speaker mode is not supported by Windows 7 and Windows Vista.

==== Sound Blaster Audigy 4 SE ====
The Sound Blaster Audigy 4 SE (SB0610VP) is a Sound Blaster Audigy 4 Pro without the remote control. However, it uses the same audio DSP and is functionally as capable as the Audigy 2 and 4 series (other than Audigy 2 SE). It features full hardware acceleration of DirectSound and EAX.

=== Sound Blaster Audigy Rx ===
The Sound Blaster Audigy Rx (SB1550), released in September 2013, uses E-MU CA10300 from Audigy 4, but with a dedicated 600-ohm headphone amplifier, one TOSLINK optical output, and a PCI Express ×1 interface supported via a PLX Technology bridge controller.

=== Sound Blaster Audigy Fx ===
The Sound Blaster Audigy Fx (SB1570), released in September 2013, is a HDA card, it uses an ALC898 chip from Realtek, includes a 600-ohm amplifier, Sound Blaster Audigy Fx Control Panel, EAX Studio Software, and independent line-in and microphone inputs. It is a half-height expansion card with a PCI Express ×1 interface.

== Alternate drivers ==
=== kX Project Drivers ===
An alternate, independent WDM driver for Windows was developed to provide user-control of the EMU10K1 and EMU10K2 chips found in many Audigy-branded cards. The kX Project driver supports mixing numerous different effects in real time and on the hardware of EMU10K1 and EMU10K2 chips. It was developed by Eugene Gavrilov. The driver is no longer maintained on a regular basis by its original authors, but the source code was freed under the GPLv2 license and continues to get contributions from time to time.

=== SB Audigy Series Support Pack ===
The latest version is based on Creative's Audigy Rx driver. For the older Audigy cards, there are both benefits and drawbacks compared to the latest official drivers: while they bring back CMSS2, which was deprecated by Creative on Vista/7, OpenAL quality is reported to differ significantly and these drivers do not support EAX in combination with OpenAL.

After Windows 10 1903 update, the drivers stopped working, they install, but there is no sound from the soundcard, neither can the Creative Audio Console see the card. A solution is to install the latest driver from Audigy RX (manually via *inf). The rest of the package (Creative programs) can be left from daniel_k package.

== See also ==
- Sound Blaster
