= FX8010 =

The FX8010, is a DSP architecture, designed for realtime audio effects, designed by E-mu, around their E-mu 10K1 chip. One key feature of the architecture, is not providing any branching instructions, but rather running the whole program in a sample locked constant loop, i.e. a constant number of instructions is executed per sample. Instructions are given conditional execution flag akin to some RISC processors (notably the ARM), thus providing a constant runtime.
