= Innovation (disambiguation) =

Innovation is the practical implementation of new ideas, or of improved goods or services.

Innovation may also refer to:

== Arts, entertainment, and media ==
=== Music ===
- Innovation (album), a 2010 album by Pink Lady
- Innovations (album), a 1985 album by El Gran Combo de Puerto Rico

=== Periodicals ===
- Innovation (magazine), a magazine compiling recent developments in the area of research in Singapore and globally
- Innovation (journal), sociological academic journal about management, innovation and sustainability.
- Innovations (journal), an academic journal about entrepreneurial solutions to global challenges
- The Innovation, interdisciplinary science journal published by Cell Press

=== Other uses in arts, entertainment, and media ===
- Innovation (TV program), a 1984–2004 American television program focusing on innovation that aired on PBS
- Innovation Comics, a Wheeling, West Virginia-based comic book company active in the late 1980s and early 1990s

== Brands and enterprises ==
- Innovation Computer, a defunct American computer systems and hardware company
- Innovations (retailer), a defunct British mail order retail company selling gizmos and gadgets
- Innovative Communications Corporation, a telecommunications company in the United States Virgin Islands
- Innovative Interfaces, a library-software company
- L'Innovation Department Store, a former Belgian department store chain, known for the disastrous 1967 L'Innovation Department Store fire

== Business terms and technology management ==
- Disruptive innovation
- Eco-innovation
- Financial innovation, a term used in some discourses on economy
- Induced innovation
- Innovation indices
- Innovation leadership
- Innovation management
- Innovation system
- Open innovation
- Outcome-Driven Innovation
- Pace of innovation
- Product innovation
- Pro-innovation bias
- Technological innovation system

== Organizations and projects ==
- Radical Innovation Project at Rensselaer Polytechnic Institute
- UNDP Innovation Facility, established by the United Nations Development Programme in 2014

== Science and technology ==
- Innovation (linguistics), a change in language that distinguishes it from conservative forms
- Innovation (biology), a change from an ancestor
- Innovation (signal processing) a concept in statistical signal processing

== Other uses ==
- Bid‘ah, any type of innovation in Islam
- Open Innovations (event), an annual forum and technology show that focuses on new technologies and perspectives of the international cooperation on innovations

== See also ==
- Innovators (disambiguation)
