= Sound card =

Computer component that processes audio

Audio interface
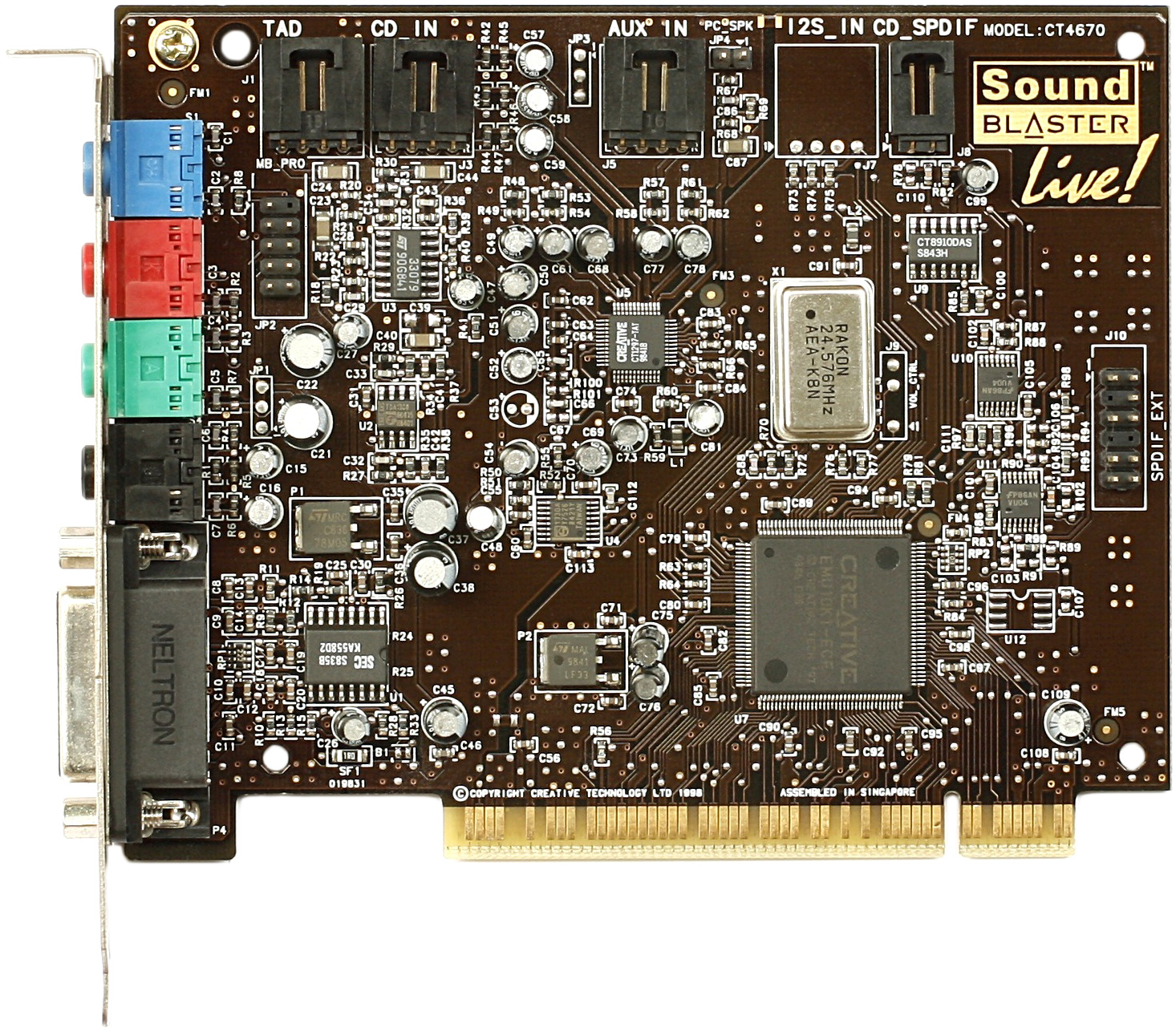
- A Sound Blaster Live! Value card, a typical (c. 2000) PCI sound card
- Connects to: Motherboard via one of: PCI; ISA; USB; FireWire; IBM PC Parallel Port; PCI-E; MCA (rare); PCMCIA interfaces (PC Card, Expresscard); Line in or out via one of: Analogue – phone, RCA or DIN connector; Digital – S/PDIF (TOSLINK or RCA) or AES/EBU; Microphone via one of: Phone connector; PIN connector
- Common manufacturers: Creative Labs (and subsidiary E-mu Systems); Realtek; C-Media; VIA Technologies; ASUS; M-Audio; Turtle Beach

A sound card (also known as an audio card) is an internal expansion card that provides input and output of audio signals to and from a computer under the control of computer programs. The term sound card is also applied to external audio interfaces used for professional audio applications.

Sound functionality can also be integrated into the motherboard, using components similar to those found on plug-in cards. The integrated sound system is often still referred to as a sound card. Sound processing hardware is also present on modern video cards with HDMI to output sound along with the video using that connector; previously, they used a S/PDIF connection to the motherboard or sound card.

Typical sound card functionality includes providing the audio component for multimedia applications such as music composition, editing video or audio, presentation, education and entertainment (games) and video projection. Sound cards are also used for computer-based communication such as voice over IP and teleconferencing.

== General characteristics ==
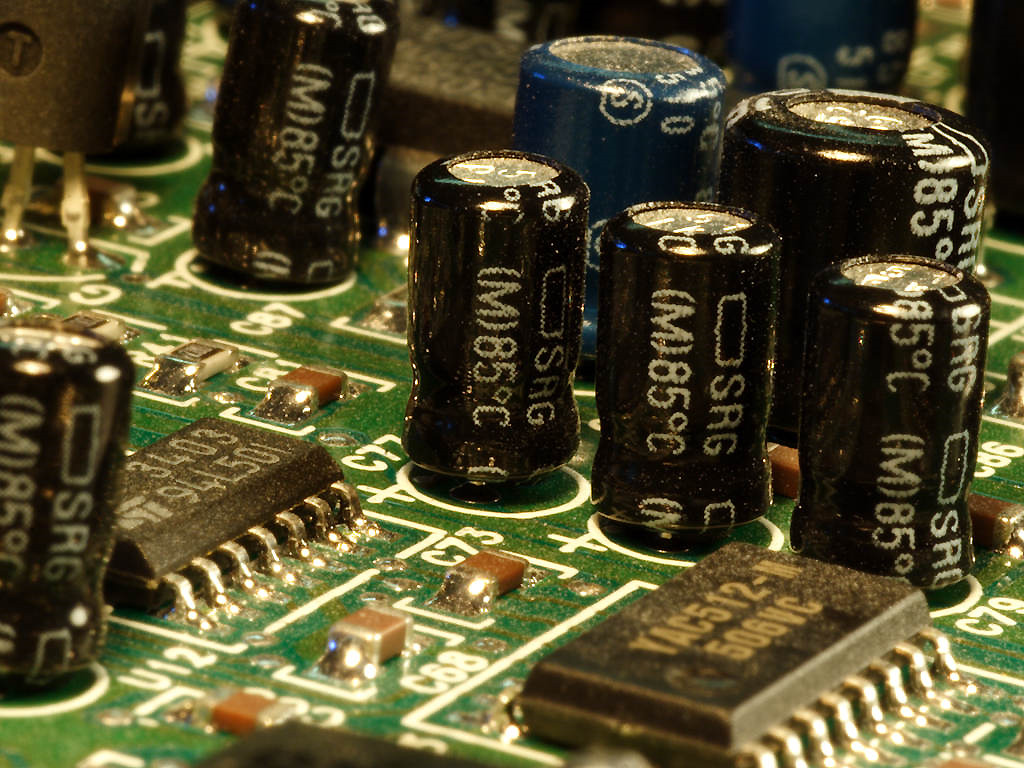
Close-up of a sound card PCB, showing electrolytic capacitors, SMT capacitors and resistors, and a YAC512 two-channel 16-bit DAC. The integrated circuit on the left is a 3403 single power supply quad operational amplifier.

Sound cards use a digital-to-analog converter (DAC), which converts recorded or generated digital signal data into an analog format. The output signal is connected to an amplifier, headphones, or external device using standard interconnects, such as a TRS phone connector. (Note: If the number and size of connectors is too large for the space on the backplate, the connectors will be off-board, typically using a breakout box, an auxiliary backplate, or a panel mounted at the front.) Some sound cards offer a headphone amplifier specially for analog headphone output.

A common external connector is the microphone connector. Input through a microphone connector can be used, for example, by speech recognition or voice over IP applications. Most sound cards have a line in connector for an analog input from a sound source that has higher voltage levels than a microphone. In either case, the sound card uses an analog-to-digital converter (ADC) to digitize this signal.

Some cards include a sound chip to support the production of synthesized sounds, usually for real-time generation of music and sound effects using minimal data and CPU time.

The card may use direct memory access to transfer the samples to and from main memory, from where a recording and playback software may read and write it to the hard disk for storage, editing, or further processing.

=== Sound channels and polyphony ===
An important sound card characteristic is polyphony, which refers to its ability to process and output multiple independent voices or sounds simultaneously. These distinct channels are seen as the number of audio outputs, which may correspond to a speaker configuration such as 2.0 (stereo), 2.1 (stereo and sub woofer), 5.1 (surround), or other configurations. Sometimes, the terms voice and channel are used interchangeably to indicate the degree of polyphony, not the output speaker configuration. For example, much older sound chips could accommodate three voices, but only one output audio channel (i.e., a single mono output), requiring all voices to be mixed together. Later cards, such as the AdLib sound card, had a 9-voice polyphony combined in 1 mono output channel.

Early PC sound cards had multiple FM synthesis voices (typically 9 or 16), which were used for MIDI music. The full capabilities of advanced cards are often not fully used; only one (mono) or two (stereo) voice(s) and channel(s) are usually dedicated to playback of digital sound samples, and playing back more than one digital sound sample usually requires a software downmix at a fixed sampling rate. Modern low-cost integrated sound cards (i.e., those built into motherboards), such as audio codecs like those meeting the AC'97 standard and even some lower-cost expansion sound cards still work this way. These devices may provide more than two sound output channels (typically 5.1 or 7.1 surround sound), but they usually have no actual hardware polyphony for either sound effects or MIDI reproduction – these tasks are performed entirely in software. This is similar to the way inexpensive softmodems perform modem tasks in software rather than in hardware.

In the early days of wavetable synthesis, some sound card manufacturers advertised polyphony solely on the MIDI capabilities alone. In this case, typically, the card is only capable of two channels of digital sound and the polyphony specification solely applies to the number of MIDI instruments the sound card is capable of producing at once.

Modern sound cards may provide more flexible audio accelerator capabilities which can be used in support of higher levels of polyphony or other purposes such as hardware acceleration of 3D sound, positional audio and real-time DSP effects.

== List of sound card standards ==
Sound card standards
Name	Year	Audio bit depth	Sampling frequency	Type	Channels
PC speaker	1981	≈6 bit (CPU speed dependent)	≈18.9 kHz (CPU speed dependent)	PWM	1 pulse-width modulation
PCjr (Note: The Tandy 1000 and the PCjr used the same sound chip, but the Tandy 1000 used the Audio IN pin, whereas the PCjr did not. This allowed the Tandy to produce the speaker sound at the same time as the SN74689)	1984	16 volume settings	122 Hz to 125 kHz	PSG	3 square wave tone; 1 white noise
Tandy 1000	1984	16 volume settings / 6 bit	122 Hz to 125 kHz	PSG	3 square wave tone; 1 white noise; 1 pulse-width modulation
MPU-401	1984			MIDI	1 MIDI in; 2 MIDI out; DIN sync out; tape sync IO; metronome out
Covox Speech Thing	1987	8 bit	7 kHz (Disney Sound Source), up to 44 kHz (CPU speed dependent)	PCM	1 DAC
AdLib	1987	64 volume settings / 8 bit	16 kHz	FM synthesizer	6-voice FM synthesizer, 5 percussion instruments
Roland MT-32	1987	16 bit	32 kHz	MIDI synthesizer	8 melodic channels; 1 rhythm channel
Sound Blaster	1989	8 bit	22.05 kHz	FM synthesizer + DSP	1 DAC; 11-voice FM synthesizer
Innovation SSI-2001	1989	8 bit	3906.19 Hz max.	PSG	3 voices
Sound Blaster Pro	1991	8 bit	44.1 kHz mono, 22.05 kHz stereo		
Roland Sound Canvas	1991	16 bit	32 kHz	MIDI synthesizer	24 voices
Gravis UltraSound	1992	16 bit	44.1 kHz	Wavetable synthesis	16 stereo channels
AC'97	1997	24 bit	96 kHz	PCM + DSP	up to 6 independent output channels
USB Audio Class 1.0	1998	16 bit	96 kHz	PCM + DSP	2 independent output channels
Environmental Audio Extensions	2001			Digital signal processing	8 simultaneous 3D voices
Intel High Definition Audio	2004	32 bit	192 kHz	PCM + DSP	up to 15 independent output channels
USB Audio Class 2.0	2005	32 bit	384 kHz	PCM + DSD + DSP	up to 255 independent output channels

== Color codes ==
Connectors on the sound cards are color-coded as per the PC System Design Guide. They may also have symbols of arrows, holes and soundwaves that are associated with each jack position.

Color	Pantone	Function	Type	Connector	Symbol
Pink	701 C	Analog microphone audio input	Input	3.5 mm minijack	A microphone
Light blue	284 C	Analog line level audio input	Input	3.5 mm minijack	Arrow going into a circle
Lime	577 C	Analog line level audio output for the main stereo signal (usually for front speakers)	Output	3.5 mm minijack	Arrow going out one side of a circle into a wave
Orange	157 C	Analog line level audio output for center channel speaker and subwoofer	Output	3.5 mm minijack	Icon of a speaker
Black	426 C	Analog line-level audio output for surround speakers, typically rear stereo	Output	3.5 mm minijack	Icon of a speaker
Silver/Grey	422 C	Analog line level audio output for surround optional side stereo	Output	3.5 mm minijack	Icon of a speaker
Brown/Dark	4645 C	Interconnect cable for right-to-left speakers	Interconnect (Note: This port is on a powered speaker, never on a soundcard.)	3.5 mm minijack	
Gold/Grey	123 C	Game port / MIDI	Input	DA-15	Game port MIDI

Many desktop PCs also include a front panel, and the front panel usually includes analog audio jacks.

Color	Symbol	Function	Connector
Pink		Analog microphone audio input (mono or stereo).	3.5 mm minijack
Lime		Analog audio output for headphones.	3.5 mm minijack

== History of sound cards for the IBM PC architecture ==
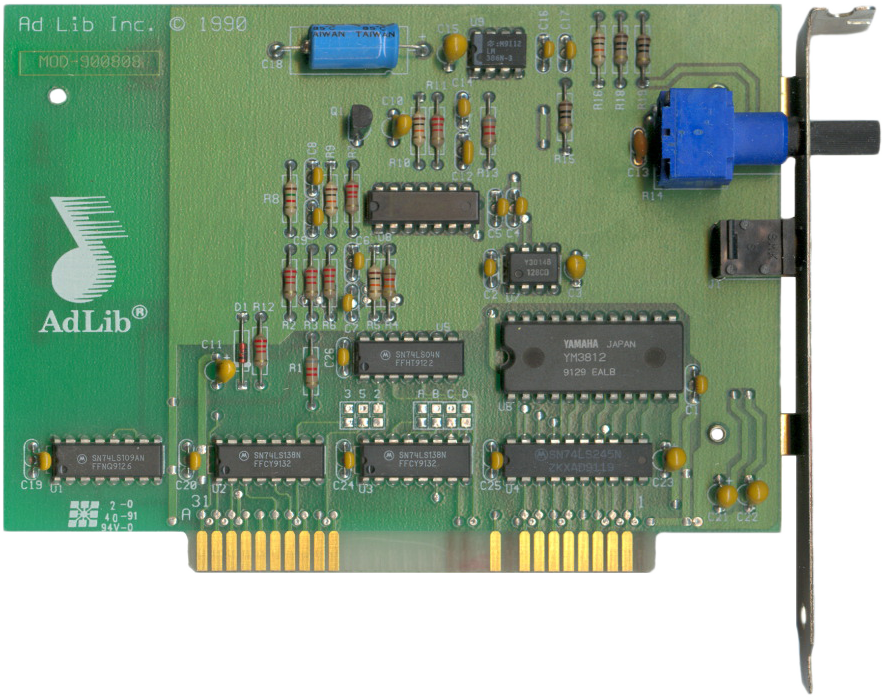
The AdLib Music Synthesizer Card was one of the first sound cards c. 1990. Note the manual volume adjustment knob. ISA-8 bus.

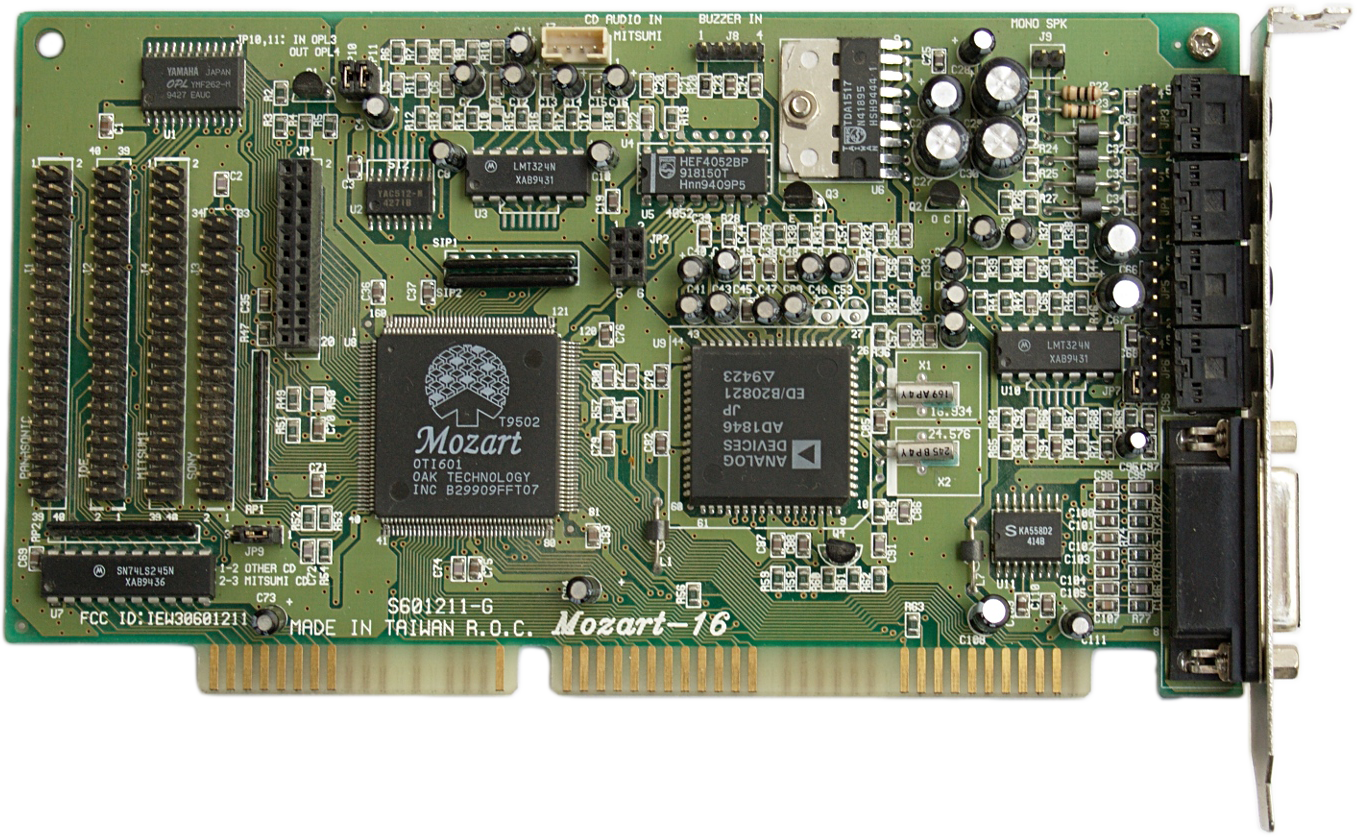
Sound card Mozart 16 for ISA-16 bus

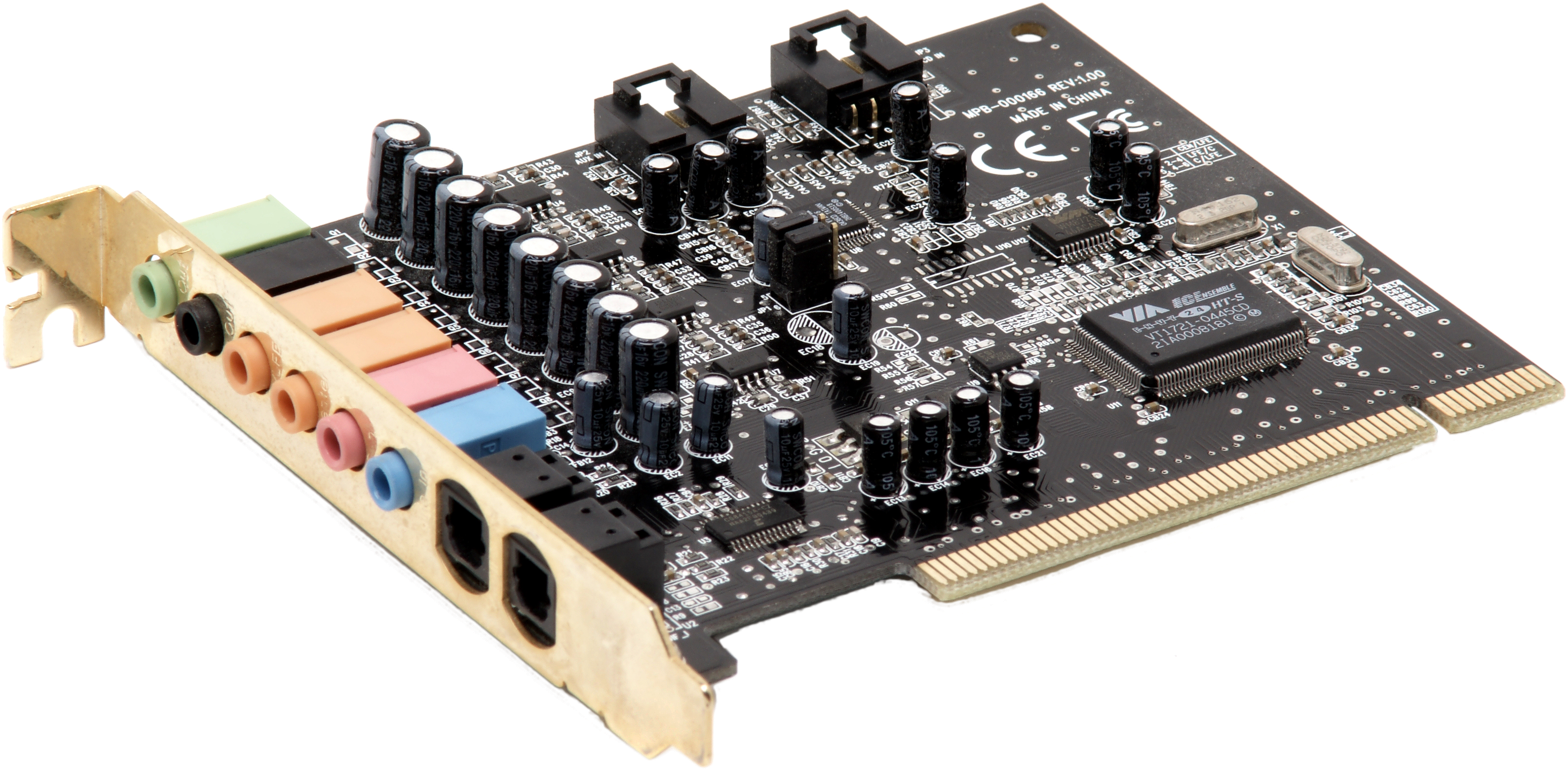
A Turtle Beach sound card for PCI bus

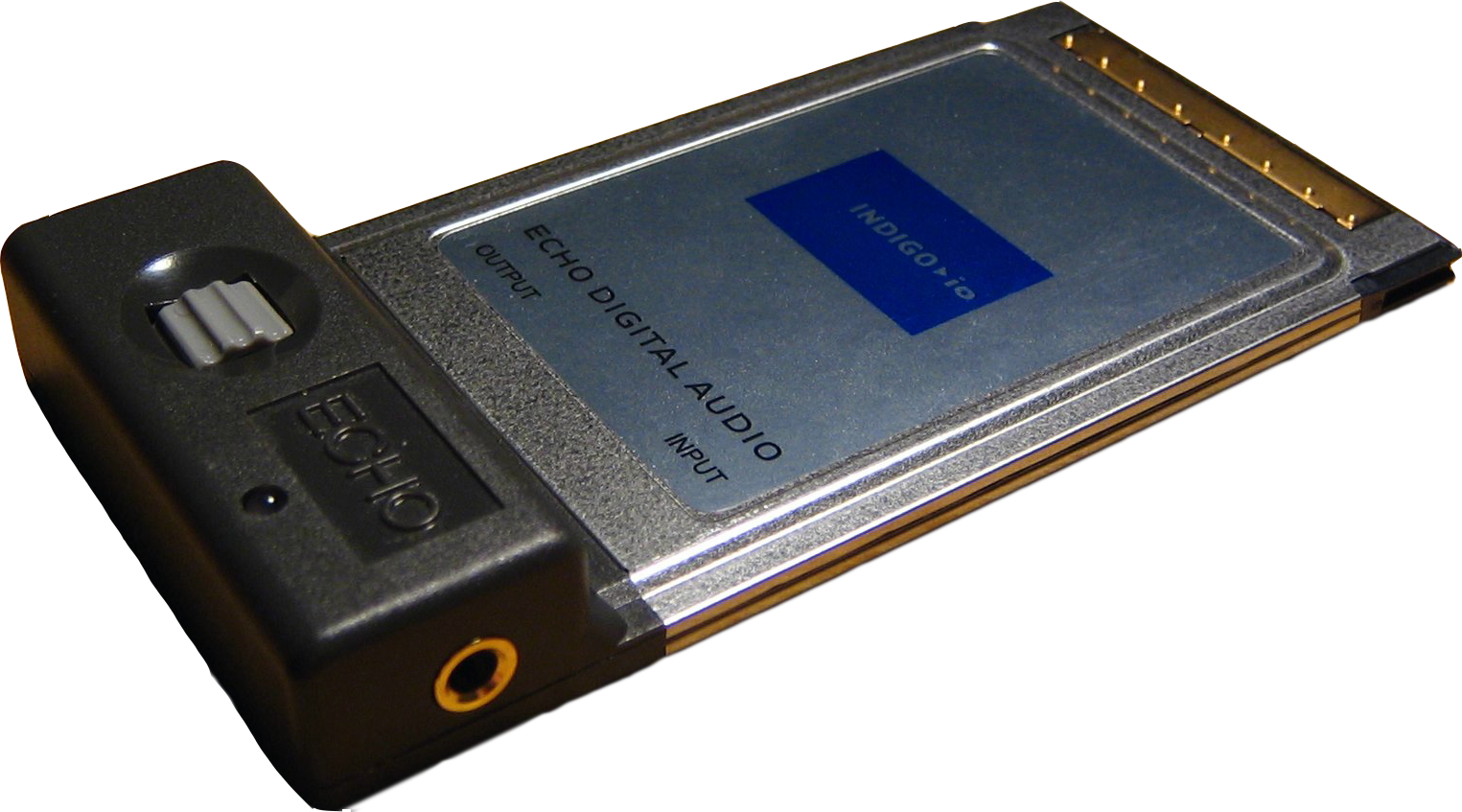
Echo Digital Audio's Indigo IO – PCMCIA card 24-bit 96 kHz stereo in/out sound card

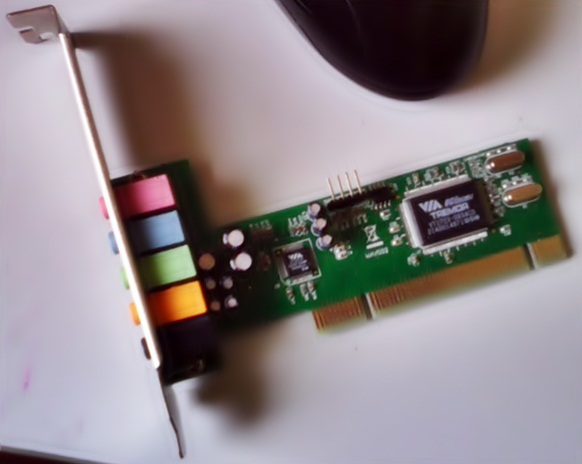
A VIA Technologies Envy sound card for PC, 5.1 channel for PCI slot

Sound cards for IBM PC–compatible computers were very uncommon until 1988. For the majority IBM PC users, the internal PC speaker was the only way for early PC software to produce sound and music. The speaker hardware was typically limited to square waves. The resulting sound was generally described as "beeps and boops" which resulted in the common nickname beeper. Several companies, most notably Access Software, developed techniques for digital sound reproduction over the PC speaker, like RealSound. The resulting audio, while functional, suffered from the heavily distorted output and low volume, and usually required all other processing to be stopped while sounds were played. Other home computers of the 1980s, like the Commodore 64, included hardware support for digital sound playback or music synthesis, leaving the IBM PC at a disadvantage when it came to multimedia applications. Early sound cards for the IBM PC platform were not designed for gaming or multimedia applications, but rather on specific audio applications, such as music composition with the AdLib Personal Music System, IBM Music Feature Card, and Creative Music System, or on speech synthesis like Digispeech DS201, Covox Speech Thing, and Street Electronics Echo.

In 1988, a panel of computer-game CEOs stated at the Consumer Electronics Show that the PC's limited sound capability prevented it from becoming the leading home computer, that it needed a $49–79 sound card with better capability than current products, and that once such hardware was widely installed, their companies would support it. Sierra On-Line, which had pioneered supporting EGA and VGA video, and 3-1/2" disks, promised that year to support the AdLib, IBM Music Feature, and Roland MT-32 sound cards in its games. A 1989 Computer Gaming World survey found that 18 of 25 game companies planned to support AdLib, six Roland and Covox, and seven Creative Music System/Game Blaster.

=== Hardware manufacturers ===
One of the first manufacturers of sound cards for the IBM PC was AdLib, which produced a card based on the Yamaha YM3812 sound chip, also known as the OPL2. The AdLib had two modes: A 9-voice mode where each voice could be fully programmed, and a less frequently used percussion mode with 3 regular voices producing 5 independent percussion-only voices for a total of 11. (Note: The percussion mode was considered inflexible by most developers; it was used mostly by AdLib's own composition software.)

Creative Labs also marketed a sound card called the Creative Music System (C/MS) at about the same time. Although the C/MS had twelve voices to AdLib's nine and was a stereo card while the AdLib was mono, the basic technology behind it was based on the Philips SAA1099 chip, which was essentially a square-wave generator. It sounded much like twelve simultaneous PC speakers would have except for each channel having amplitude control, and failed to sell well, even after Creative renamed it the Game Blaster a year later, and marketed it through RadioShack in the US. The Game Blaster retailed for under $100 and was compatible with many popular games, such as Silpheed.

A large change in the IBM PC-compatible sound card market happened when Creative Labs introduced the Sound Blaster card. Recommended by Microsoft to developers creating software based on the Multimedia PC standard, the Sound Blaster cloned the AdLib and added a sound coprocessor (Note: This was likely an Intel microcontroller relabeled by Creative.) for recording and playback of digital audio. The card also included a game port for adding a joystick, and the capability to interface to MIDI equipment using the game port and a special cable. With AdLib compatibility and more features at nearly the same price, most buyers chose the Sound Blaster. It eventually outsold the AdLib and dominated the market.

Roland also made sound cards in the late 1980s such as the MT-32 and LAPC-I. Roland cards sold for hundreds of dollars. Many games, such as Silpheed and Police Quest II, had music written for their cards. The cards were often poor at sound effects, such as laughs, but for music were by far the best sound cards available until the mid-nineties. Some Roland cards, such as the SCC, and later versions of the MT-32, were made to be less expensive.

By 1992, one sound card vendor advertised that its product was "Sound Blaster, AdLib, Disney Sound Source and Covox Speech Thing Compatible!" Responding to readers complaining about an article on sound cards that unfavorably mentioned the Gravis Ultrasound, Computer Gaming World stated in January 1994 that, "The de facto standard in the gaming world is Sound Blaster compatibility ... It would have been unfair to have recommended anything else." The magazine that year stated that Wing Commander II was "Probably the game responsible" for making it the standard card. The Sound Blaster line of cards, together with the first inexpensive CD-ROM drives and evolving video technology, ushered in a new era of multimedia computer applications that could play back CD audio, add recorded dialogue to video games, or even reproduce full motion video (albeit at much lower resolutions and quality in early days). The widespread decision to support the Sound Blaster design in multimedia and entertainment titles meant that future sound cards such as Media Vision's Pro Audio Spectrum and the Gravis Ultrasound had to be Sound Blaster compatible if they were to sell well. Until the early 2000s, when the AC'97 audio standard became more widespread and eventually usurped the SoundBlaster as a standard due to its low cost and integration into many motherboards, Sound Blaster compatibility was a standard that many other sound cards supported to maintain compatibility with many games and applications released.

=== Industry adoption ===
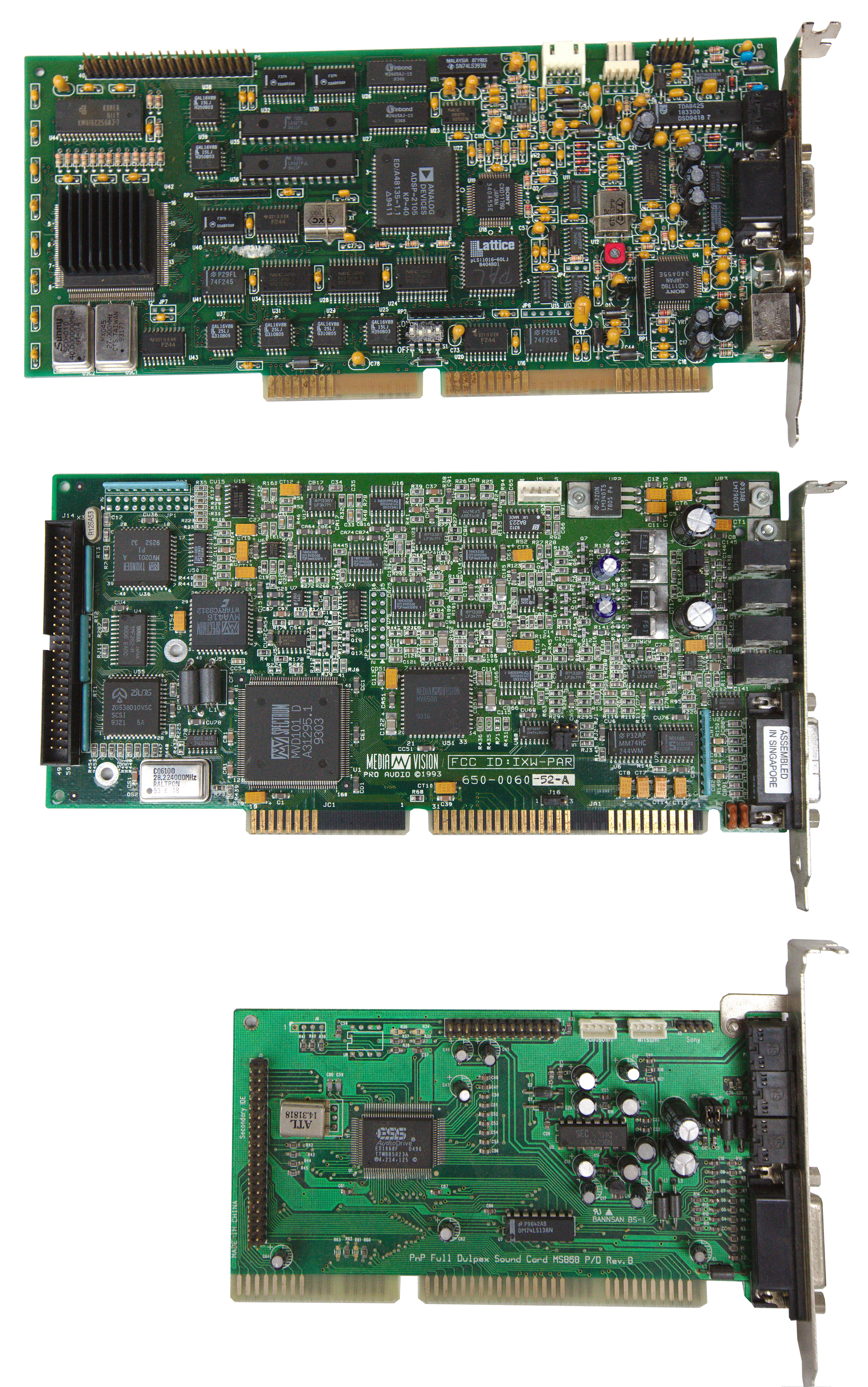
Three early ISA (16-bit) PC sound cards showing the progression toward integrated chipsets

When game company Sierra On-Line opted to support add-on music hardware in addition to built-in hardware such as the PC speaker and built-in sound capabilities of the IBM PCjr and Tandy 1000, what could be done with sound and music on the IBM PC changed dramatically. Two of the companies Sierra partnered with were Roland and AdLib, opting to produce in-game music for King's Quest 4 that supported the MT-32 and AdLib Music Synthesizer. The MT-32 had superior output quality, due in part to its method of sound synthesis as well as built-in reverb. Since it was the most sophisticated synthesizer they supported, Sierra chose to use most of the MT-32's custom features and unconventional instrument patches, producing background sound effects (e.g., chirping birds, clopping horse hooves, etc.) before the Sound Blaster brought digital audio playback to the PC. Many game companies also supported the MT-32, but supported the Adlib card as an alternative because of the latter's higher market base. The adoption of the MT-32 led the way for the creation of the MPU-401, Roland Sound Canvas and General MIDI standards as the most common means of playing in-game music until the mid-1990s.

=== Feature evolution ===
Early ISA bus sound cards were half-duplex, meaning they could not record and play digitized sound simultaneously. Later, ISA cards like the SoundBlaster AWE series and Plug-and-play Soundblaster clones supported simultaneous recording and playback, but at the expense of using up two IRQ and DMA channels instead of one. Conventional PCI bus cards generally do not have these limitations and are mostly full-duplex.

Sound cards have evolved in terms of digital audio sampling rate (starting from 8-bit 11025 Hz, to 32-bit, 192 kHz that the latest solutions support). Along the way, some cards started offering wavetable synthesis, which provides superior MIDI synthesis quality relative to the earlier Yamaha OPL based solutions, which use FM synthesis. Some higher-end cards (such as Sound Blaster AWE32, Sound Blaster AWE64 and Sound Blaster Live!) introduced their own RAM and processor for user-definable sound samples and MIDI instruments as well as to offload audio processing from the CPU. Later, the integrated audio (AC'97 and later HD Audio) prefers the use of a software MIDI synthesizer, for example, Microsoft GS Wavetable SW Synth in Microsoft Windows.

With some exceptions, (Note: The E-MU card family, the Gravis GF-1 and AMD Interwave support up to 32 channels.) for years, sound cards, most notably the Sound Blaster series and their compatibles, had only one or two channels of digital sound. Early games and MOD-players needing more channels than a card could support had to resort to mixing multiple channels in software. Even today, the tendency is still to mix multiple sound streams in software, except in products specifically intended for gamers or professional musicians.

==== Crippling of features ====
As of 2024, sound cards are not commonly programmed with the audio loopback systems commonly called stereo mix, wave out mix, mono mix or what u hear, which previously allowed users to digitally record output otherwise only accessible to speakers.

Lenovo and other manufacturers fail to implement the feature in hardware, while other manufacturers disable the driver from supporting it. In some cases, loopback can be reinstated with driver updates. Alternatively, software such as Virtual Audio Cable can be purchased to enable the functionality. According to Microsoft, the functionality was hidden by default in Windows Vista to reduce user confusion, but is still available, as long as the underlying sound card drivers and hardware support it.

Ultimately, the user can use the analog loophole and connect the line out directly to the line in on the sound card. However, in laptops, manufacturers have gradually moved from providing 3 separate jacks with TRS connectors – usually for line in, line out/headphone out and microphone – into just a single combo jack with TRRS connector that combines inputs and outputs.

=== Outputs ===
The number of physical sound channels has also increased. The first sound card solutions were mono. Stereo sound was introduced in the early 1980s, and quadraphonic sound came in 1989. This was shortly followed by 5.1 channel audio. The latest sound cards support up to 8 audio channels for the 7.1 speaker setup.

A few early sound cards had sufficient power to drive unpowered speakers directly – for example, two watts per channel. With the popularity of amplified speakers, sound cards no longer have a power stage, though in many cases they can adequately drive headphones.

=== Professional sound cards ===
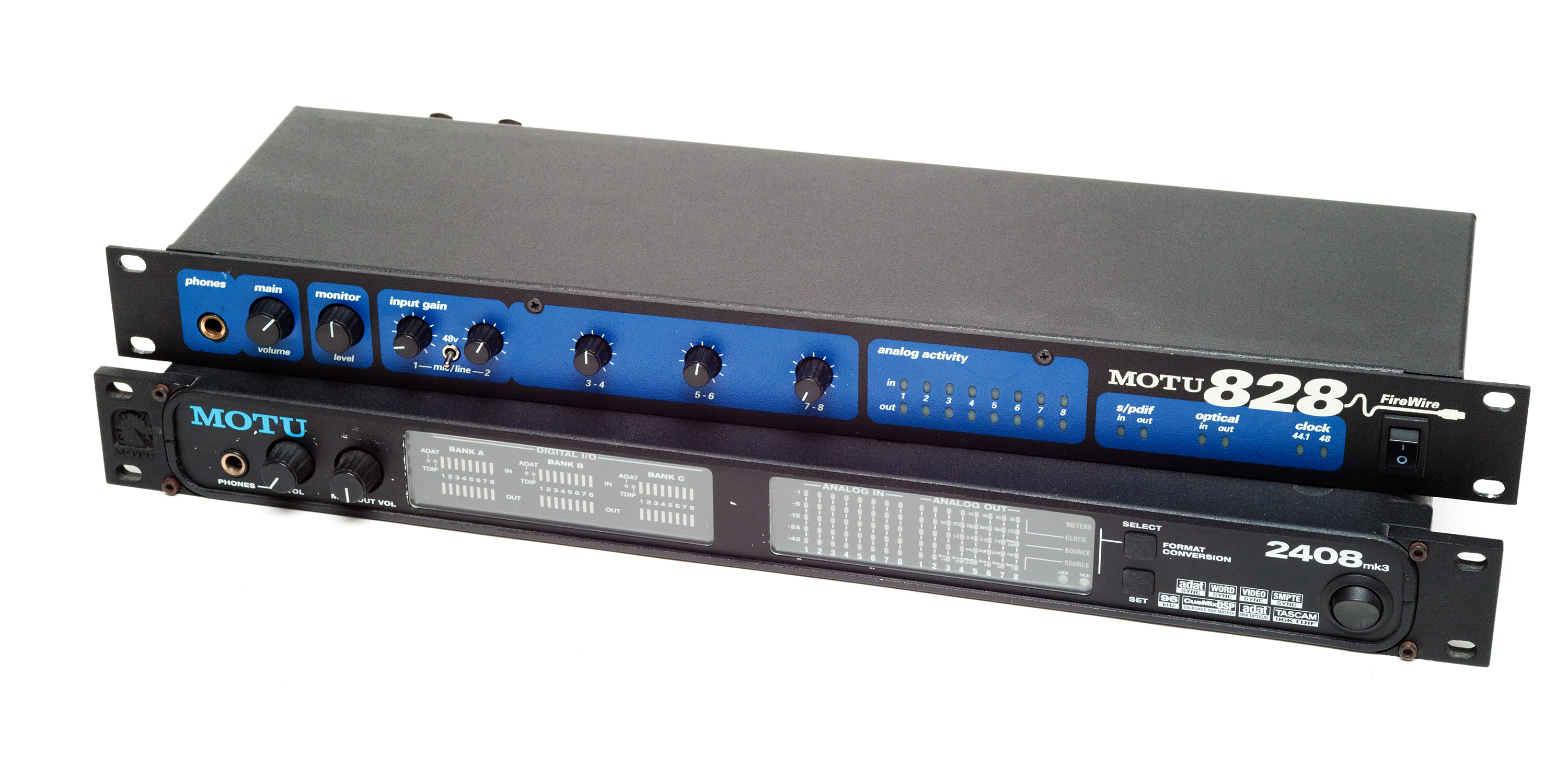
A pair of professional rackmount audio interfaces

Professional sound cards are sound cards optimized for high-fidelity, low-latency multichannel sound recording, sound playback and/or gaming. Their drivers usually follow the Audio Stream Input/Output protocol for use with professional sound engineering and music software. (Note: ASIO drivers are also available for a range of consumer-grade sound cards.)

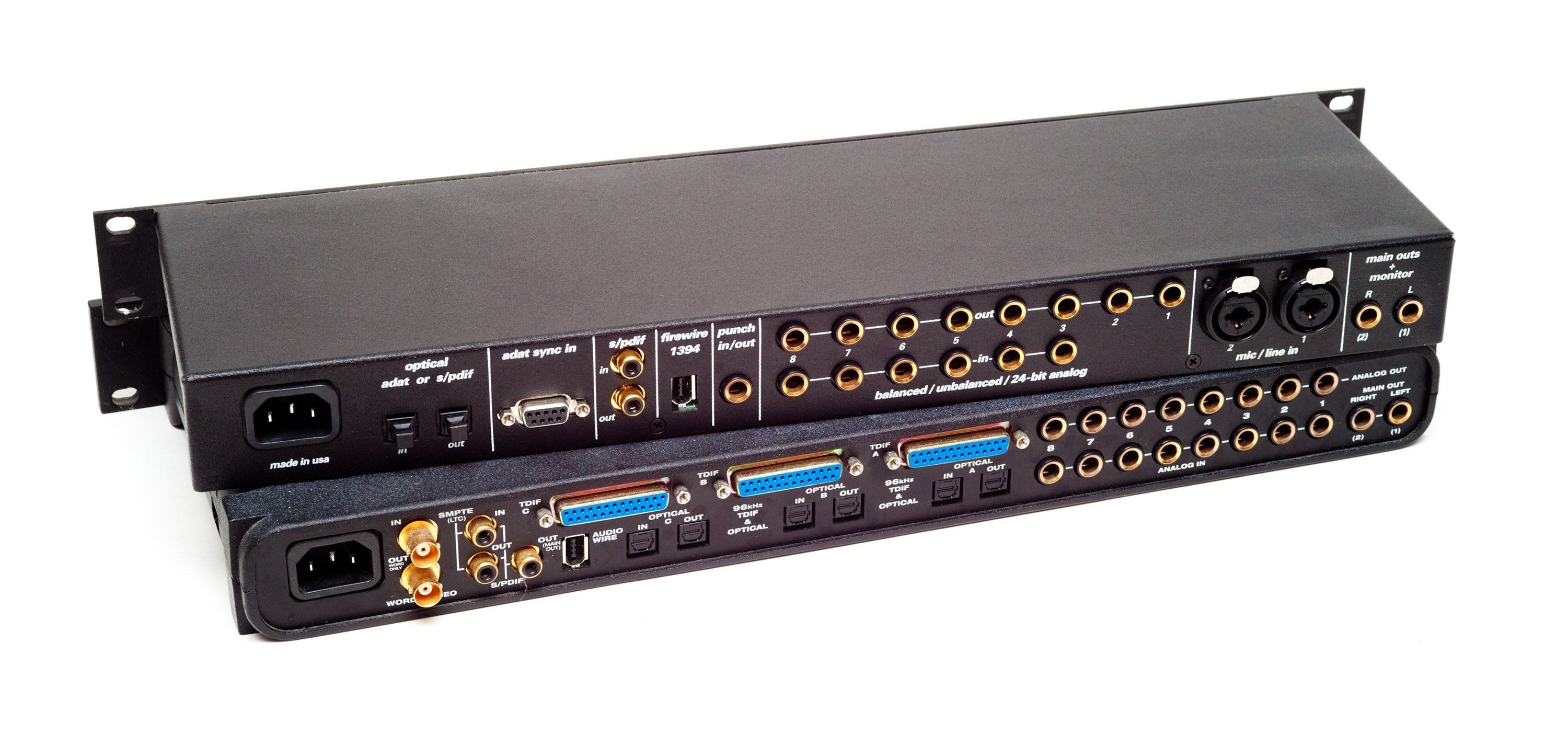
Professional audio interfaces often have industry-standard inputs in addition to analogue audio, in this case ADAT, TDIF, and S/PDIF.

Professional sound cards are usually described as audio interfaces, and sometimes have the form of external rack-mountable units using USB, FireWire, or an optical interface, to offer sufficient data rates. The emphasis in these products is, in general, on multiple input and output connectors, direct hardware support for multiple input and output sound channels, as well as higher sampling rates and fidelity as compared to the usual consumer sound card.

On the other hand, certain features of consumer sound cards, such as support for 3D audio, hardware acceleration in video games, or real-time ambiance effects, are secondary, nonexistent or even undesirable in professional audio interfaces.

The typical consumer-grade sound card is intended for generic home, office, and entertainment purposes with an emphasis on playback and casual use, rather than catering to the needs of audio professionals. In general, consumer-grade sound cards impose several restrictions and inconveniences that would be unacceptable to an audio professional. Consumer sound cards are also limited in the effective sampling rates and bit depths they can actually manage and have lower numbers of less flexible input channels. Professional studio recording use typically requires more than the two channels that consumer sound cards provide, and more accessible connectors, unlike the variable mixture of internal—and sometimes virtual—and external connectors found in consumer-grade sound cards.

== Sound devices other than expansion cards ==
=== Integrated sound hardware on PC motherboards ===
In 1984, the first IBM PCjr had a rudimentary 3-voice sound synthesis chip (the SN76489) which was capable of generating three square-wave tones with variable amplitude, and a pseudo-white noise channel that could generate primitive percussion sounds. The Tandy 1000, initially a clone of the PCjr, duplicated this functionality, with the Tandy 1000 TL/SL/RL models adding digital sound recording and playback capabilities. Many games during the 1980s that supported the PCjr's video standard (described as Tandy-compatible, Tandy graphics, or TGA) also supported PCjr/Tandy 1000 audio.

In the late 1990s, many computer manufacturers began to replace plug-in sound cards with an audio codec chip (a combined audio AD/DA-converter) integrated into the motherboard. Many of these used Intel's AC'97 specification. Others used inexpensive ACR slot accessory cards.

From around 2001, many motherboards incorporated full-featured sound cards, usually in the form of a custom chipset, providing something akin to full Sound Blaster compatibility and relatively enough-quality sound. However, the Sound Blaster compatibility features were dropped when AC'97 was superseded by Intel's HD Audio standard, which was released in 2004, again specified the use of a codec chip, and slowly gained acceptance. As of 2011, most motherboards have returned to using a codec chip, albeit an HD Audio compatible one, and the requirement for Sound Blaster compatibility has been relegated to history.

Some lower-cost integrated sound cards may create some sound distortion, as their electromagnetic shielding circuits may be cost down.

=== Integrated sound on other platforms ===
Many home computers have their own motherboard-integrated sound devices: Commodore 64, Amiga, PC-88, FM-7, FM Towns, Sharp X1, X68000, BBC Micro, Electron, Archimedes, Atari 8-bit computers, Atari ST, Atari Falcon, Amstrad CPC, later revisions of the ZX Spectrum, MSX, Mac, and Apple IIGS. Workstations from Sun, Silicon Graphics and NeXT do as well. In some cases, most notably in those of the Macintosh, Apple IIGS, Amiga, C64, SGI Indigo, X68000, MSX, Falcon, Archimedes, FM-7 and FM Towns, they provide very advanced capabilities (as of the time of manufacture), in others, they are only minimal capabilities. Some of these platforms have also had sound cards designed for their bus architectures that cannot be used in a standard PC.

Several Japanese computer platforms, including the MSX, X1, X68000, FM Towns and FM-7, have built-in FM synthesis sound from Yamaha by the mid-1980s. By 1989, the FM Towns computer platform featured built-in PCM sample-based sound and supported the CD-ROM format.

The custom sound chip on Amiga, named Paula, has four digital sound channels (2 for the left speaker and 2 for the right) with 8-bit resolution (Note: With patches, 14/15-bit resolution could be accomplished at the cost of high CPU usage.) for each channel and a 6-bit volume control per channel. Sound playback on the Amiga was done by reading directly from the chip RAM without using the main CPU.

Most arcade video games have integrated sound chips. In the 1980s, it was common to have a separate microprocessor for handling communication with the sound chip.

=== Sound cards on other platforms ===
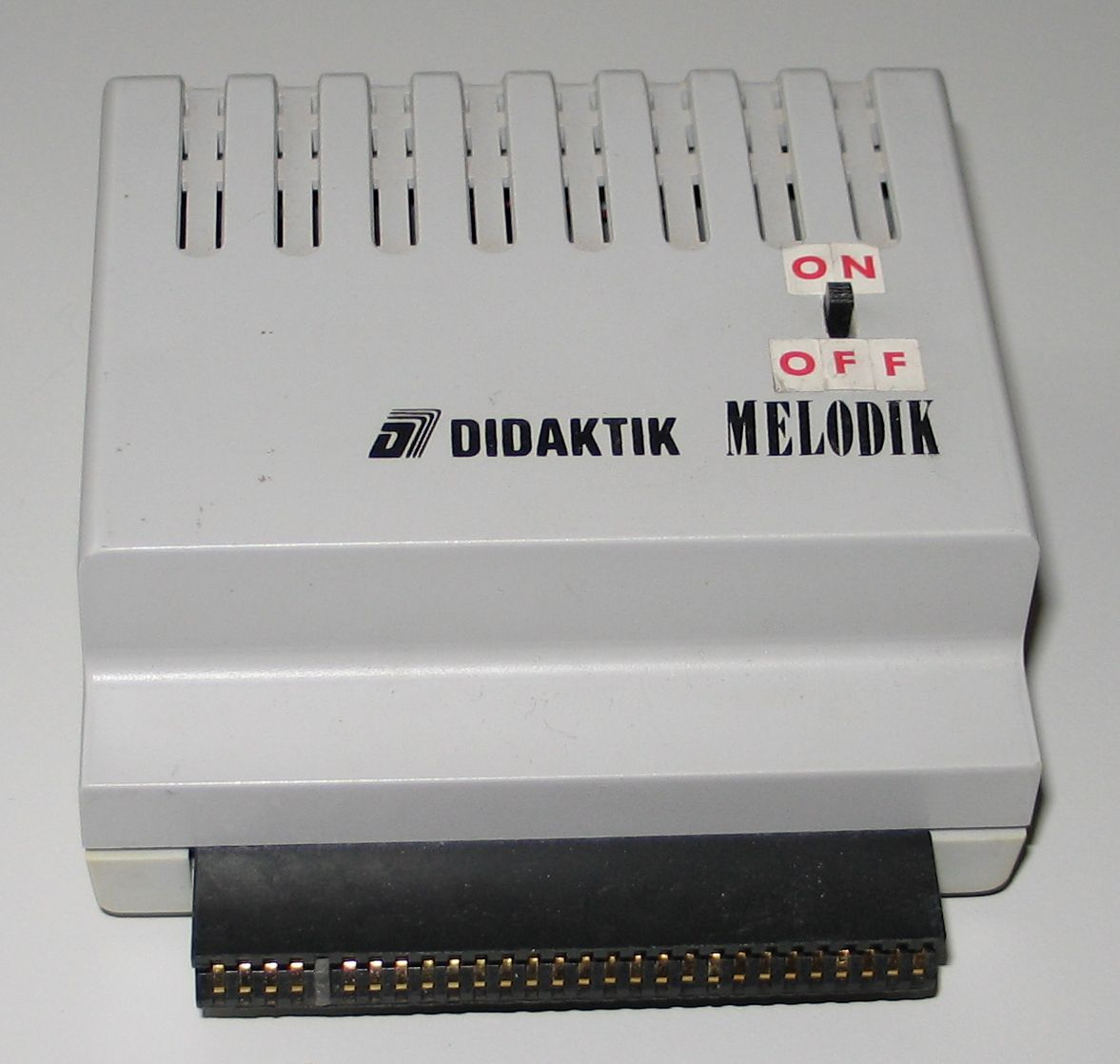
Melodik sound card with the AY-3-8912 chip for the Didaktik

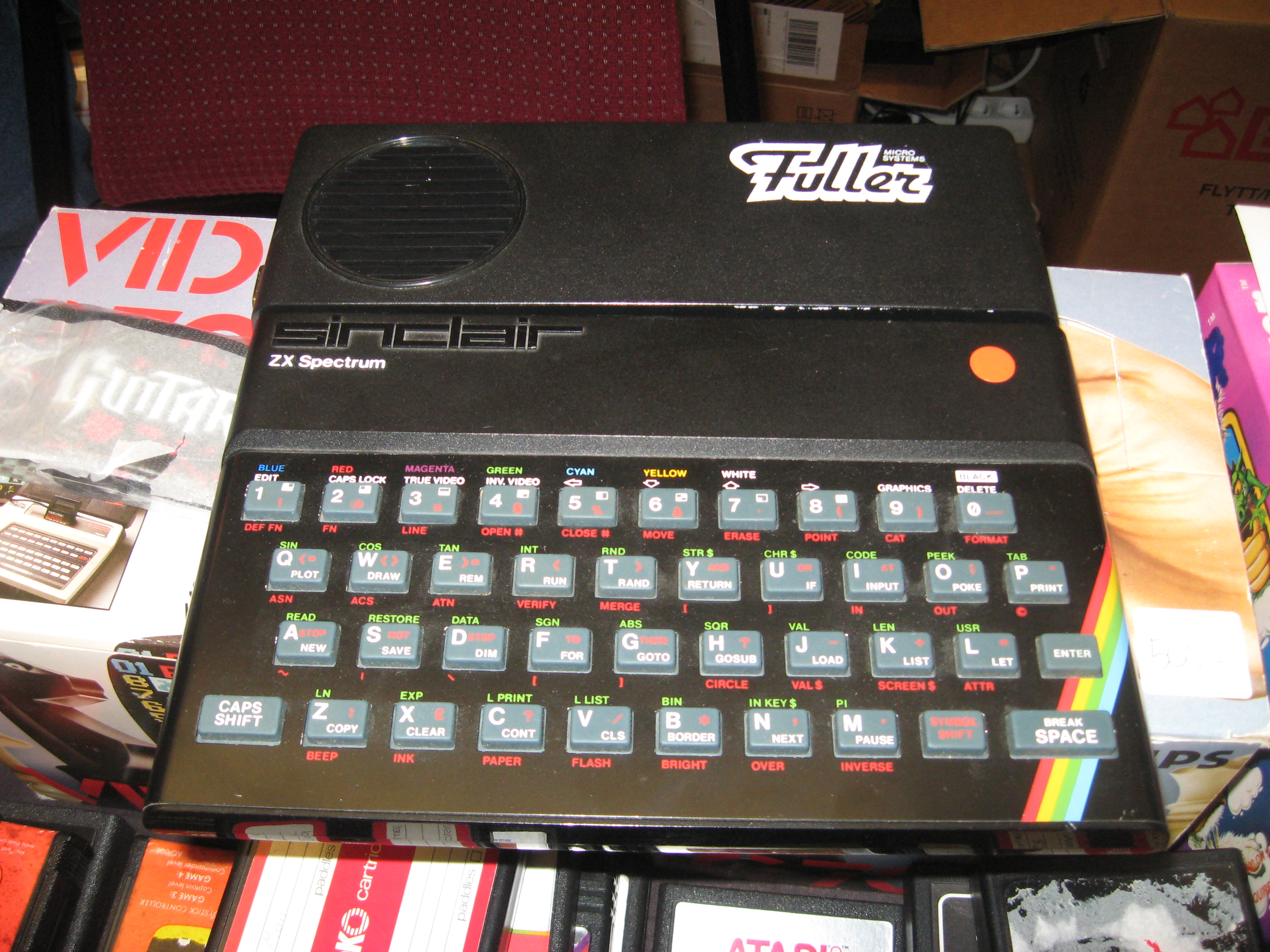
ZX Spectrum with Fuller soundbox

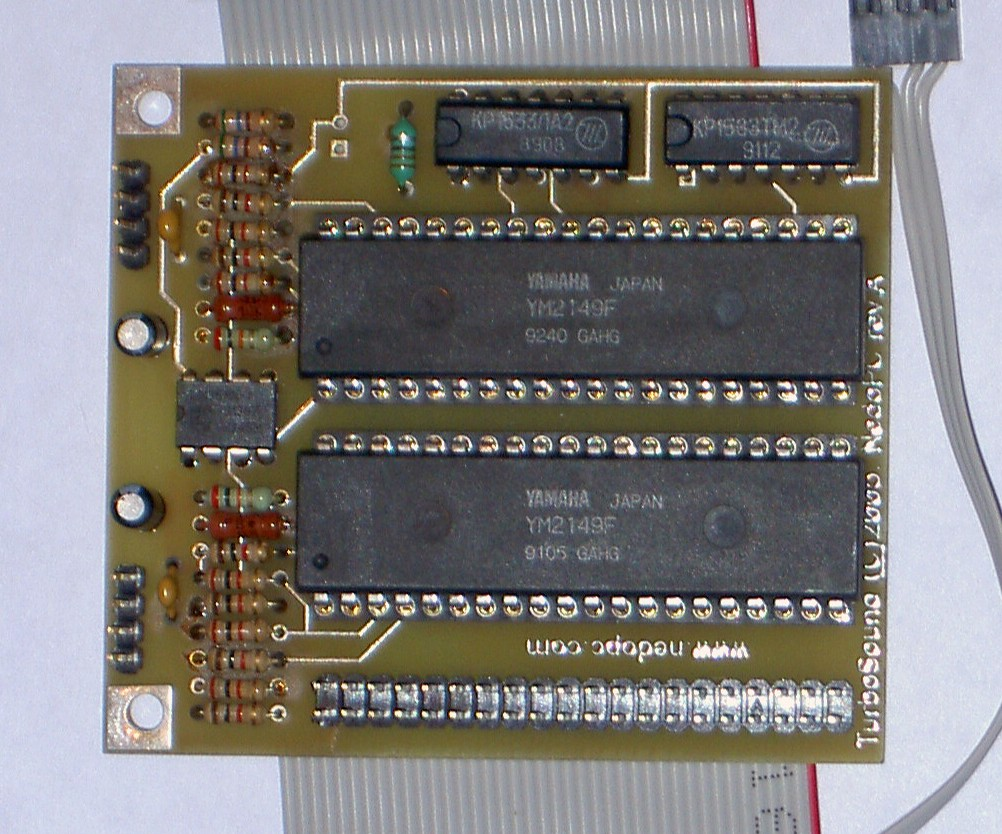
Turbo Sound board manufactured by NedoPC, revision A

The earliest known sound card used by computers was the Gooch Synthetic Woodwind, a music device for PLATO terminals, and is widely hailed as the precursor to sound cards and MIDI. It was invented in 1972.

Certain early arcade machines made use of sound cards to achieve playback of complex audio waveforms and digital music, despite already being equipped with onboard audio. An example of a sound card used in arcade machines is the Digital Compression System card, used in games from Midway such as Mortal Kombat II on the Midway T-Unit hardware. The T-Unit hardware already has an onboard OPM YM2151 FM chip coupled with an OKI MSM6295 DAC, but said game uses an added-on DCS card instead. The card is also used in the arcade version of Midway and Aerosmith's Revolution X for complex looping music and speech playback. (Note: Revolution X used fully sampled songs from the band's album that transparently looped – an impressive feature at the time the game was released.)

MSX computers, while equipped with built-in sound capabilities, also relied on sound cards to produce better-quality audio. There were sound cards called MSX-Music and MSX-Audio for the system, which used OPLL and OPL1 chipsets, respectively. The Moonsound, created by Sunrise Swiss, uses an OPL4 sound chip.

The Apple II computers, which did not have sound capabilities beyond rapidly clicking a speaker until the Apple IIGS, could use plug-in sound cards from a variety of manufacturers. The first, in 1978, was ALF's Apple Music Synthesizer, with 3 voices; two or three cards could be used to create 6 or 9 voices in stereo. Later, ALF created the Apple Music II, a 9-voice model. The most widely supported card, however, was the Mockingboard. Sweet Micro Systems sold the Mockingboard in various models. Early Mockingboard models ranged from 3 voices in mono, while some later designs had 6 voices in stereo. Some software supported use of two Mockingboard cards, which allowed 12-voice music and sound. A 12-voice, single-card clone of the Mockingboard called the Phasor was made by Applied Engineering.

The ZX Spectrum that initially only had a beeper had some sound cards made for it. Examples include TurboSound Other examples are the Fuller Box, and Zon X-81.

The Commodore 64, while having an integrated SID (Sound Interface Device) chip, also had sound cards made for it. For example, the Sound Expander, which added an OPL FM synthesizer.

Contrary to popular belief, the PC-98 series of computers do not have any integrated sound and their default configuration is a PC speaker driven by a timer, like their IBM PC cousins. Sound cards were made for the C-Bus expansion slots that these computers had, most of which used Yamaha's FM and PSG chips and made by NEC themselves, although aftermarket clones can also be purchased, and Creative did release a C-Bus version of the Sound Blaster line of sound cards for the platform.

=== External sound devices ===
Devices such as the Covox Speech Thing could be attached to the parallel port of an IBM PC and fed 6- or 8-bit PCM sample data to produce audio. Also, many types of professional sound cards take the form of an external FireWire or USB unit, usually for convenience and improved fidelity.

Sound cards using the PC Card interface were available before laptops and notebook computers routinely had onboard sound. Most of these units were designed for mobile DJs, providing separate outputs to allow both playback and monitoring from one system; however, some also target mobile gamers.

==== USB sound cards ====
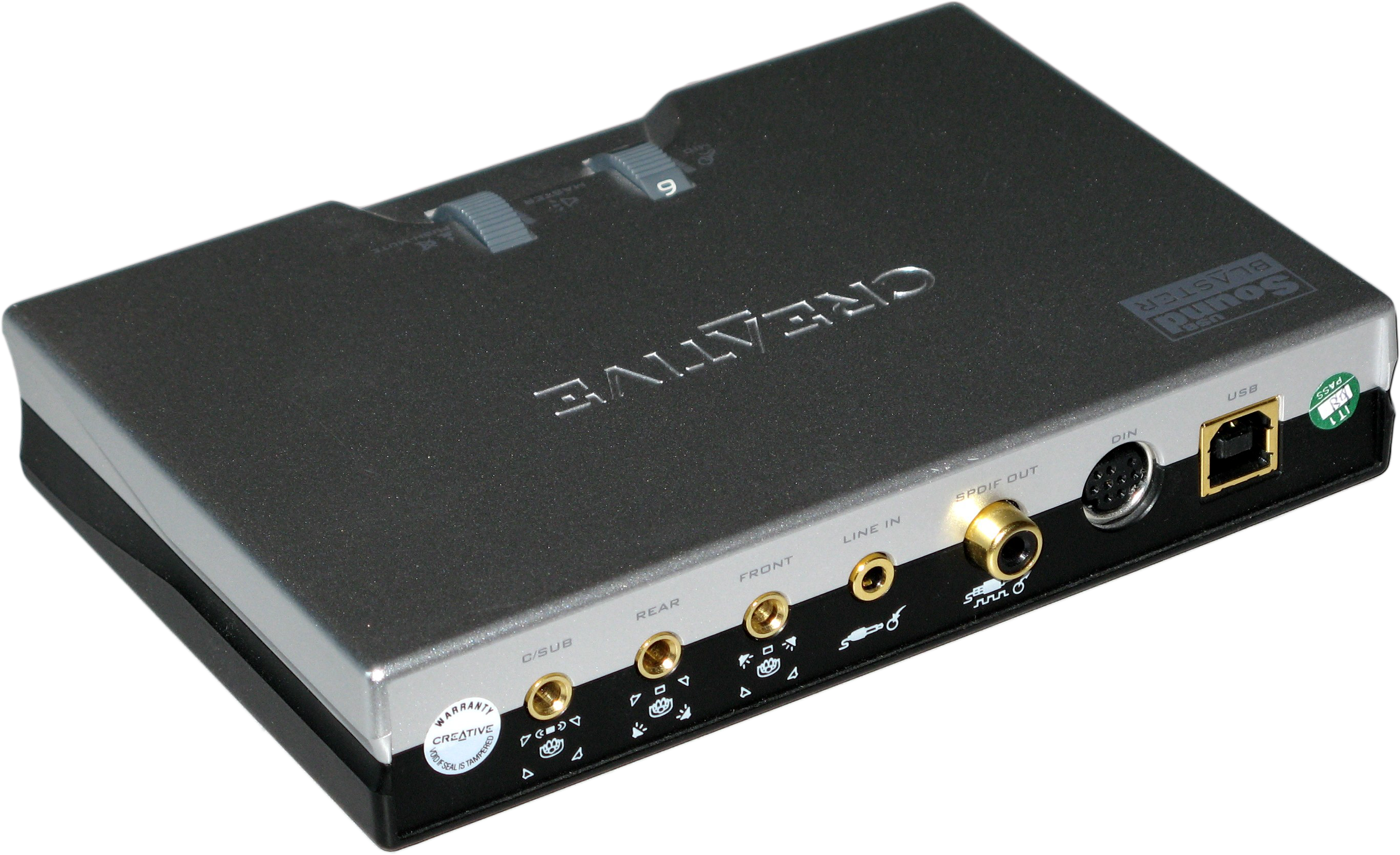
USB sound card

USB sound cards are external devices that plug into the computer via USB. They are often used in studios and on stage by electronic musicians, including live PA performers and DJs. DJs who use DJ software typically use sound cards integrated into DJ controllers or specialized DJ sound cards. DJ sound cards sometimes have inputs with phono preamplifiers to allow turntables to be connected to the computer to control the software's playback of music files with vinyl emulation.

The USB specification defines a standard interface, the USB audio device class, allowing a single driver to work with the various USB sound devices and interfaces on the market. Mac OS X, Windows, and Linux support this standard. However, some USB sound cards do not conform to the standard and require proprietary drivers from the manufacturer.

Cards meeting the older USB 1.1 specification are capable of high-quality sound with a limited number of channels, but USB 2.0 or later are more capable with their higher bandwidths.

== Uses ==
The main function of a sound card is to play audio, usually music, with varying formats (monophonic, stereophonic, various multiple speaker setups) and degrees of control. The source may be a CD or DVD, a file, streamed audio, or any external source connected to a sound card input. Audio may be recorded. Sometimes, sound card hardware and drivers do not support recording a source that is being played.

=== Non-sound uses ===
Sound cards can be used to generate (output) arbitrary electrical waveforms, as any digital waveform played by the soundcard is converted to the desired output within the bounds of its capabilities. In other words, sound cards are consumer-grade arbitrary waveform generators. A number of free and commercial software allow sound cards to act like function generators by generating desired waveforms from functions; there are also online services that generate audio files for any desired waveforms, playable through a sound card.

Sound cards can also be used to record electrical waveforms, in the same way it records an analog audio input. The recording can be displayed by special or general-purpose audio-editing software (acting as an oscilloscope) or further transformed and analyzed. A protection circuit should be used to keep the input voltage within acceptable bounds.

As general-purpose waveform generators and analyzers, sound cards are bound by several design and physical limitations.

- Sound cards have a limited sample rate, typically up to 192 kHz. Under the assumptions of the Nyquist–Shannon sampling theorem, this means a maximum signal frequency (bandwidth) of half that: 96 kHz. Real sound cards tend to have a bandwidth smaller than implied by the Nyquist limit from internal filtering.
- As with all ADCs and DACs, sound cards produce distortion and noise. A typical integrated sound card, the Realtek ALC887, according to its data sheet, has distortion about 80 dB below the fundamental; cards are available with distortion better than −100 dB.
- Sound cards commonly suffer from some clock drift, requiring correction of measurement results.

Sound cards have been used to analyze and generate the following types of signals:

- Sound equipment testing. A very-low-distortion sinewave oscillator can be used as input to equipment under test; the output is sent to a sound card's line input and run through Fourier transform software to find the amplitude of each harmonic of the added distortion. Alternatively, a less pure signal source may be used, with circuitry to subtract the input from the output, attenuated and phase-corrected; the result is distortion and noise only, which can be analyzed.
- Gamma spectroscopy. A sound card can serve as a cheap multichannel analyzer for gamma spectroscopy, which allows one to distinguish different radioactive isotopes.
- Longwave radio. A 192 KHz sound card can be used to receive radio signals up to 96 kHz. This bandwidth is enough for longwave time signals such as the DCF77 (77.5 KHz). A coil is attached to the input side as an antenna, while special software decodes the signal. A sound card can also work in the opposite direction and generate low-power time signal transmissions (JJY at 40 KHz, using harmonics).

== Driver architecture ==
To use a sound card, the operating system (OS) typically requires a specific device driver, a low-level program that handles the data connections between the physical hardware and the operating system. Some operating systems include the drivers for many cards; for cards not so supported, drivers are supplied with the card or available for download.

- MS-DOS programs for IBM PC compatibles often used universal middleware driver libraries (such as the HMI Sound Operating System, the Miles Audio Interface Libraries (AIL), the Miles Sound System etc.) which had drivers for most common sound cards. Some card manufacturers provided terminate-and-stay-resident drivers for their products. Often, the driver is a Sound Blaster and AdLib emulator designed to allow their products to emulate a Sound Blaster and AdLib, and to allow games that could only use SoundBlaster or AdLib sound to work with the card. Finally, some programs simply had driver or middleware source code incorporated into the program itself for the sound cards that were supported.
- Windows uses drivers generally written by the sound card manufacturers. Many device manufacturers supply the drivers on their own discs or to Microsoft for inclusion in Windows. USB audio device class support is present from Windows 98 onwards. Since Microsoft's Universal Audio Architecture (UAA) initiative which supports HD Audio, FireWire and USB audio class standards, a universal class driver by Microsoft can be used. The driver is included with Windows Vista. For Windows XP, Windows 2000 or Windows Server 2003, the driver can be obtained by contacting Microsoft support. Almost all manufacturer-supplied drivers for such devices also include this universal class driver.
- A number of versions of UNIX make use of the portable Open Sound System (OSS). Drivers are seldom produced by the card manufacturer.
- Most present-day Linux distributions make use of the Advanced Linux Sound Architecture (ALSA). (Note: Up until Linux kernel 2.4, OSS was the standard sound architecture for Linux, although ALSA can be downloaded, compiled and installed separately for kernels 2.2 or higher. But from kernel 2.5 onwards, ALSA was integrated into the kernel and the OSS native drivers were deprecated. Backward compatibility with OSS-based software is maintained, however, by the use of the ALSA-OSS compatibility API and the OSS-emulation kernel modules.)
- Mockingboard support on the Apple II is usually incorporated into the programs themselves, as many programs for the Apple II boot directly from disk. However, a TSR is shipped on a disk that adds instructions to Apple Basic so users can create programs that use the card, provided that the TSR is loaded first.

== List of notable sound card manufacturers ==
- Asus
- Advanced Gravis Computer Technology (defunct)
- AdLib (defunct)
- Aureal Semiconductor (defunct)
- Auzentech (defunct)
- C-Media
- Creative Technology
- E-mu (bought out by Creative)
- ESS Technology
- Hercules Computer Technology
- HT Omega
- IBM
- Korg
- Media Vision
- M-Audio
- Onkyo
- Turtle Beach Systems
- VIA Technologies

== See also ==
- Audio signal processing
- Cross-platform Audio Creation Tool (XACT)
- DirectMusic
- DirectSound
- EAX
- OpenAL
- PC System Design Guide
- Sound card mixer
