= Innovators (disambiguation) =

An innovator is a person or organization who is one of the first to introduce into reality something better than before.

Innovator and 'Innovators may also refer to:

- The Innovators: How a Group of Inventors, Hackers, Geniuses, and Geeks Created the Digital Revolution, 2014 book written by Walter Isaacson
- The Innovators: The Men Who Built America, 2012 American television miniseries docudrama
- Innovators (Mobile Suit Gundam 00), characters from the Japanese anime television series Mobile Suit Gundam 00
- Innovator potato
- Innovator (rapper), South Korean rapper born 1988
- Innovator Mosquito Air, Canadian helicopter from Innovator Technologies
- Bird Innovator, an amphibious airplane from Bird Corporation

== See also ==
- Philips Innovator, yacht
- Innovation (disambiguation)
