= Anthony Ulwick =

American business executive

- Born: Anthony W. Ulwick
- Occupation(s): Founder and CEO of Strategyn, LLC.
- Known for: Outcome-Driven Innovation

Anthony (Tony) W. Ulwick is the founder and chief executive officer of Strategyn, LLC. an innovation consulting firm based in San Francisco. He is the creator of Outcome-Driven Innovation (ODI).

== Innovation consulting ==
Ulwick began working on innovation strategies in 1980 while working at IBM. In January 2002, Harvard Business Review published Ulwick's article “Turn Customer Input into Innovation,” which outlined Ulwick's innovation concept of “outcomes that customers are seeking” that encourages companies to develop products to fulfill what their customers are trying to accomplish.

The Outcome-Driven Innovation (ODI) method outlined in the Harvard Business Review received Harvard Business Review’s distinction as one of the seven best “breakthrough ideas for today’s business agenda” in 2002.

In 2005, Ulwick explained his theory in the book “What Customers Want: Using Outcome-Driven Innovation to Create Breakthrough Products and Services”.

In October 2016, Ulwick released a second book – “Jobs to be Done: Theory to Practice”.

== Strategyn, LLC. ==
Ulwick founded the innovation consultancy Strategyn in 1991. Today the firm has offices in the United States, Europe, and Australia. Strategyn has worked with corporations including Bosch, Colgate-Palmolive, Hewlett-Packard, Ingersoll Rand, Johnson & Johnson, Kimberly-Clark, Microsoft, and Motorola to implement ODI. The results of a 2010 innovation track record study indicate that 86% of the projects using Strategyn's innovation methodology were rated as successful by the sponsoring company.

== Publications ==
Ulwick is the author of the following publications:

- What Customers Want: Using Outcome-Driven Innovation to Create Breakthrough Products and Services (Aug 16, 2005)
- Business Strategy Formulation: Theory, Process, and the Intellectual Revolution (Oct 30, 1999)
- Ofrezca A Sus Clientes Lo Que Desea (Spanish Edition) (May 12, 2006)
- The Customer-Centered Innovation Map by Lance A. Bettencourt and Anthony W. Ulwick (Mar 3, 2009)
- Turn Customer Input into Innovation (HBR OnPoint Enhanced Edition) (Mar 3, 2009)
- Customer-Driven Innovation (HBR Article Collection) by Lance A. Bettencourt, Anthony W. Ulwick, Clayton M. Christensen and Scott Cook (Mar 3, 2009)
- Jobs to be Done: Theory to Practice (Oct 16, 2016)
