= Virtual Audio Cable =

Audio routing software

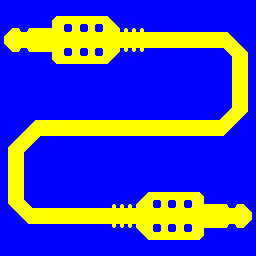

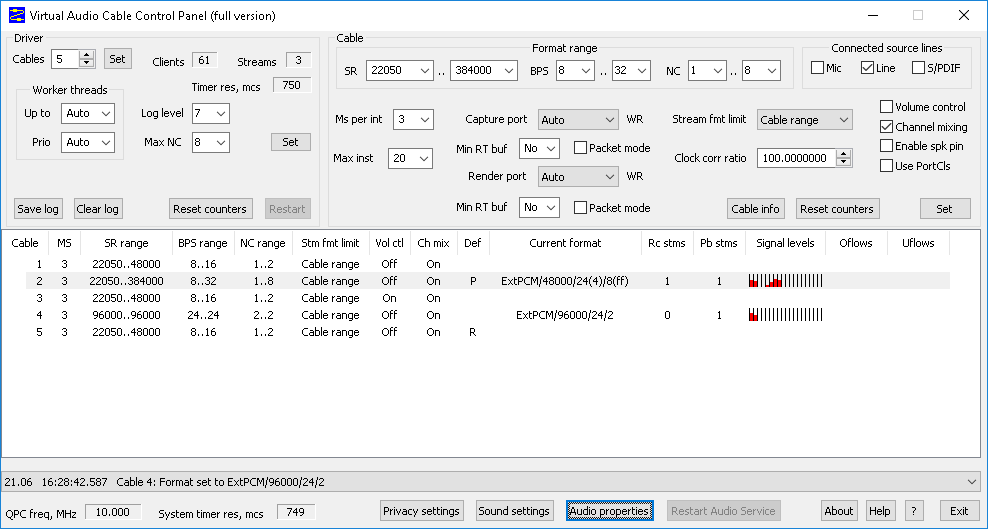
- VAC 4.71 Control Panel
- Developer: Eugene Muzychenko
- Release: 14 October 1998; 27 years ago
- Stable release: 4.71 / 21 June 2026; 3 months ago
- Written in: C++
- Operating system: Microsoft Windows
- Available in: English
- Type: Audio software
- License: Shareware, Freeware (feature-limited)
- Website: vac.muzychenko.net

Virtual Audio Cable is a virtual audio device software product based on WDM multimedia driver that allows a user to transfer audio streams from one application to another. Any application is able to send an audio stream to the input side of a "virtual cable" while a corresponding application can receive this stream from the output side. Since all transfers are made digitally, there is no loss in sound quality. VAC is the audio equivalent of a MIDI loopback device such as MultiMid or Hubi, and can be used instead of "Stereo Mix" or "What U Hear" features of audio adapters.

If more than one application is sending audio through an output virtual cable, VAC is able to mix all of the streams together or create separate corresponding virtual input cables. Similarly, more than one application is able to receive audio from an input cable, whether it's sharing the same audio data with another target or receiving its own personal audio stream. VAC is useful for recording an application's audio output in almost real time or transferring a sound stream to another application so it may process it. A person could use two or more software audio generators, synthesizers or sequencers to produce audio streams and send them to a VAC output cable and record the mixed stream from the VAC input cable using any type of recording software.

Because VAC routes audio streams in almost real time, it is able to be utilized in various manners. A person is capable of using VAC to record an output audio stream from an application that normally does not allow saving the audio to files. Practically, the input port records the audio signal (for example from a music player) and sends it to the destination program (such as a sound processor or analyzer) using the output port. A user could also manipulate VAC into recording conversations through Voice Over IP (VoIP) or Internet telephony applications such as Skype (for example, with SAM Broadcaster), produce live audio podcasts, redirect audio channels to multiple monitors, or even decode weather faxes.
