= Product innovation =

Product innovation is the creation and subsequent introduction of a good or service that is either new, or an improved version of previous goods or services. This is broader than the normally accepted definition of innovation that includes the invention of new products which, in this context, are still considered innovative.

== Introduction ==
Product innovation is defined as:

the development of new products, changes in design of established products, or use of new materials or components in the manufacture of established products

Numerous examples of product innovation include introducing new products, enhanced quality and improving its overall performance. Product innovation, alongside cost-cutting innovation and process innovation, are three different classifications of innovation which aim to develop a company's production methods.

Thus product innovation can be divided into two categories of innovation: radical innovation which aims at developing a new product, and incremental innovation which aims at improving existing products.

== Advantages and disadvantages ==
Advantages of product innovation include:

- Growth, expansion and gaining a competitive advantage: A business that is capable of differentiating their product from other businesses in the same industry to large extent will be able to reap profits. This can be applied to how smaller businesses can use product innovation to better differentiate their product from others. Product differentiation can be defined as "A marketing process that showcases the differences between products. Differentiation looks to make a product more attractive by contrasting its unique qualities with other competing products. Successful product differentiation creates a competitive advantage for the seller, as customers view these products as unique or superior." Therefore, small businesses that are able to utilize product innovation effectively will be able to expand and grow into larger businesses, while gaining a competitive advantage over its remaining competitors.
- Brand switching: Businesses that once again are able to successfully utilize product innovation will thus entice customers from rival brands to buy its product instead as it becomes more attractive to the customer. One example of successful product innovation that have led to brand switching are the introduction of the iPhone to the mobile phone industry (which has caused mobile phone users to switch from Nokia, Motorola, Sony Ericsson, etc. to the Apple iPhone).

Disadvantages of product innovation include:

- Counter effect of product innovation: Not all businesses/competitors do not always create products/resources from scratch, but rather substitute different resources to create productive innovation and this could have an opposite effect of what the business/ competitor is trying to do. Thus, some of these businesses/ competitors could be driven out of the industry and will not last long enough to enhance their product during their time in the industry.
- High costs and high risk of failure: When a business attempts to innovate its product, it injects much capital and time into it, which requires severe experimentation. Constant experimentation could result in failure for the business and will also cause the business to incur significantly higher costs. Furthermore, it could take years for a business to successfully innovate a product, thus resulting in an uncertain return.
- Disrupting the outside world: For product innovation to occur, the business will have to change the way it runs, and this could lead to the breaking down of relationships between the business and its customers, suppliers and business partners. In addition, changing too much of a business's product could lead to the business gaining a less reputable image due to a loss of credibility and consistency.

== Theories of product innovation ==
Popular theories of product innovation - what causes it and how it is achieved - include Outcome-Driven Innovation and "Jobs to be Done" (JTBD). JTBD Theory is used extensively as part of a methodical approach to product innovation postulating that users "hire" a product to do a "job" and that innovation can be achieved by providing a better way of getting a particular job done.

Used as a framework, JTBD is very similar to outcome-driven innovation, focusing on the functional, emotional, and social 'jobs' that users want to perform. However, this is one of two main interpretations of the theory known as "Jobs-as-action." The second interpretation is known as "Jobs-as-progress" and focuses on what the user wants to be, stating that the jobs a product user wants to do are secondary to (and a result of) the person they want to be.

== New product development ==
New product development is the initial step before the product life cycle can be examined, and plays a vital role in the manufacturing process. To prevent loss of profits or liquidation for businesses in the long term, new products have to be created to replace the old products. Peter Drucker suggests in his book 'Innovation and Entrepreneurship' that both product innovation and entrepreneurship are interconnected and must be used together in unison for a business to be successful, and this relates to the process of new product development.

=== Stages ===
These are the few stages that a business has to undergo when introducing a new product line into the market:

1. Market research: This can be done in the form of primary and secondary market research where the business will gather as much information as possible about the present tastes and preferences of its potential consumers, and the gaps filled in the business's particular industry. Secondary market research involves gathering data that has already been collected by another party, and is primarily based on information that has been founded from previous studies. One advantage of secondary market research over primary market research is that it is low-cost, thus enabling the business to be able to invest its time into other more important matters and new potential business ventures. Primary market research involves the business gathering data individually, and this can be done via various sampling methods. Other forms of primary market research include focus groups, interviews, questionnaires, etc. One advantage of primary market research over secondary market research is that it delivers much more specific results than secondary market research, and is only available to the business itself, rather than secondary research which is made globally available, as data has already been collected.
2. Product development and testing: This stage involves creating a test product called a prototype. The prototype ensures the business that its product is functioning properly, and all the necessary arrangements are made to enhance the product as much as possible. After the prototype has been devised, the business can now use test marketing where the business introduces a product to a small group of individuals to give the company insight into the effectiveness of the product from the views of their potential customers.
3. Feasibility study: The business will now look at the legal and financial restrictions of launching the product into the market. This is where the business will create sales forecasts, establish the price of the product, the overall costs of production and profitability estimates. The business also has to consider legal aspects in terms of safety and Intellectual Property Rights (IPR).

After all these stages have been successfully run through, then the business can officially launch the product.

== Classification of innovation ==
Product innovation can be classified by degree of technical novelty and by type of novelty in terms of market. Technical product innovations include the use of new materials, the use of new intermediate products, new functional parts, the use of radically new technology and fundamental new functions. Classification by levels of novelty include new only to the firm, new to the industry in the country or to the operating market of the firm, or new to the world.

Existing product development is a process of innovation where products/services are redesigned, refurbished, improved, and manufactured which can be at a lower cost. This will provide benefits to both the company and the consumer in different ways; for example, increased revenue (benefits the company) cheaper costs (benefits the company and consumer) or even benefits the environment by implementation of 'green' production methods.

== Measuring innovation ==
The Oslo Manual recommends certain guidelines for measuring innovation through the measurement of aspects in the innovation process and innovation expenditure. Measurement processes consists of collecting and systemizing qualitative and quantitative data regarding different factors of the innovation process, investment and outcome.

Quantitative data focus on product investment, impact and life cycle. Examples of key quantitative indicators include product investment, total innovation investment, product sales share that comes from innovation, manpower use, material consumption, energy consumption, time taken to reach the commercialisation phase or the expected cost recovery or payback period.

Qualitative data includes benefits of the innovation, sources of information or ideas for the innovation, and diffusion or reach of innovation. Even though similar information can be obtained through quantitative methods, the guidelines argues that due to the qualitative nature of the answers, firms are inclined to provide richer and a different set of data, avoiding duplication.

== Vs. other forms of innovation ==
While the difference between different forms of innovation seems intuitively clear, it is not always obvious what kind of innovation is occurring in practice. While there are different dimensions to consider whether it is a product innovation rather than e.g. a technology or business model innovation, it is not always possible to clearly differentiate one from the other. For example, compared to a business model innovation, a product innovation often has:

- Lower strategic importance
- Lower risk, impact, and uncertainty
- Lower complexity
- More clarity about who is in charge
- Fewer actors and stakeholders
- Fewer different disciplines involved
- Smaller set of skills and capabilities necessary

== Journals ==
- Journal of Product Innovation Management
- Journal of Innovation Management

== See also ==
- Design thinking
- New product development
- Service innovation
- Oslo Manual
