= Ad Lib, Inc. =

Canadian manufacturer

- Industry: Consumer electronics
- Founded: 1987 in Quebec City, Canada
- Founder: Martin Prevel
- Defunct: 1992
- Fate: Bankrupt; assets bought by Binnenalster GmbH, in 1994 resold to Softworld Taiwan
- Headquarters: Canada
- Key people: Martin Prevel (CEO)
- Products: Audio, Computer-related products

Ad Lib, Inc. was a Canadian manufacturer of sound cards and other computer equipment founded by Martin Prevel, a former professor of music and vice-dean of the music department at the Université Laval. The company's best known product, the AdLib Music Synthesizer Card (ALMSC), or simply the AdLib as it was called, was the first add-on sound card for IBM compatibles to achieve widespread acceptance, becoming the first de facto standard for audio reproduction.

== History ==
After development work on the AdLib Music Synthesizer Card had concluded, the company struggled to engage the software development community with their new product. As a result, Ad Lib partnered with Top Star Computer Services, Inc., a New Jersey company that provided quality assurance services to game developers. Top Star's President, Rich Heimlich, was sufficiently impressed by a product demonstration in Quebec in 1987 to endorse the product to his top customers. Sierra On-Line's King's Quest IV became the first game to support AdLib. The game's subsequent success helped to launch the AdLib card into mainstream media coverage. As sales of the card rose, many developers began including support for the AdLib in their programs.

The success of the AdLib Music Card soon attracted competition. Not long after its introduction, Creative Labs introduced its competing Sound Blaster card. The Sound Blaster was fully compatible with AdLib's hardware, and it also implemented two key features absent from the AdLib: a PCM audio channel and a game port. With additional features and better marketing, the Sound Blaster quickly overshadowed AdLib as the de facto standard in PC gaming audio. AdLib's slow response, the AdLib Gold, did not sell well enough to sustain the company.

In 1992, Ad Lib filed for bankruptcy, while the Sound Blaster family continued to dominate the PC game industry. That same year, Binnenalster GmbH from Germany acquired the assets of the company. Ad Lib was renamed AdLib Multimedia and relaunched the AdLib Gold sound card and many other products. Binnenalster sold AdLib Multimedia to Softworld Taiwan in 1994.

== Products ==
=== AdLib Music Synthesizer Card (1987) ===
AdLib used Yamaha's YM3812 sound chip, which produces sound by FM synthesis. The AdLib card consisted of a YM3812 chip with off-the-shelf external glue logic to plug into a standard PC-compatible ISA 8-bit slot.

PC software generated multitimbral music and sound effects through the AdLib card, although the acoustic quality was distinctly synthesized. Digital audio (PCM) was not supported; this would become a key missing feature when the competitor Creative Labs implemented it in their Sound Blaster cards. It was still possible, however, to output PCM sound with software by modulating the playback volume at an audio rate, as was done, for example, in the MicroProse game F-15 Strike Eagle II and the multi-channel music editor Sound Club for MS-DOS.

There are two separate revisions of the original AdLib sound card. The original design from 1987 provided mono output to a ¼-inch jack aimed for composers and musicians, while the second design from 1990 used a 3.5 mm miniature mono output, which was quickly becoming the new standard in the computer and game industry.

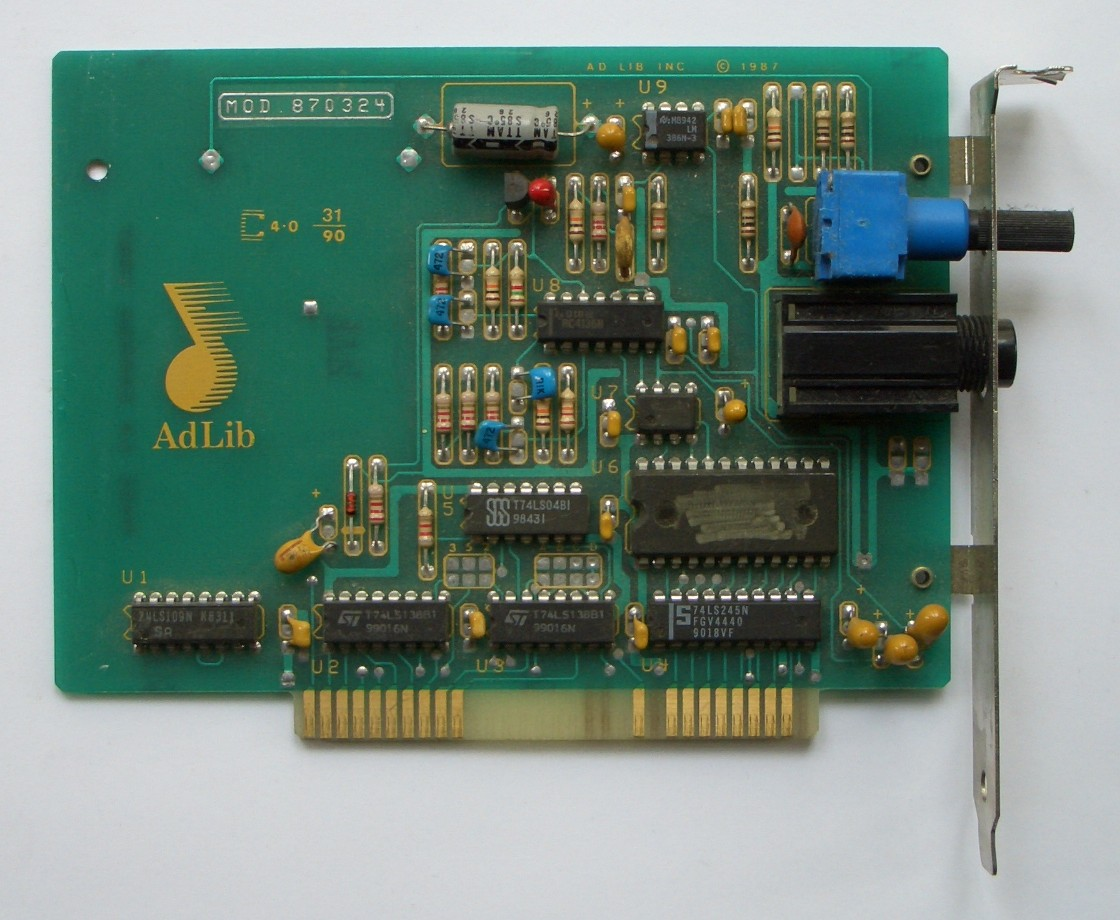
Original 1987 AdLib Music Synthesizer Card model

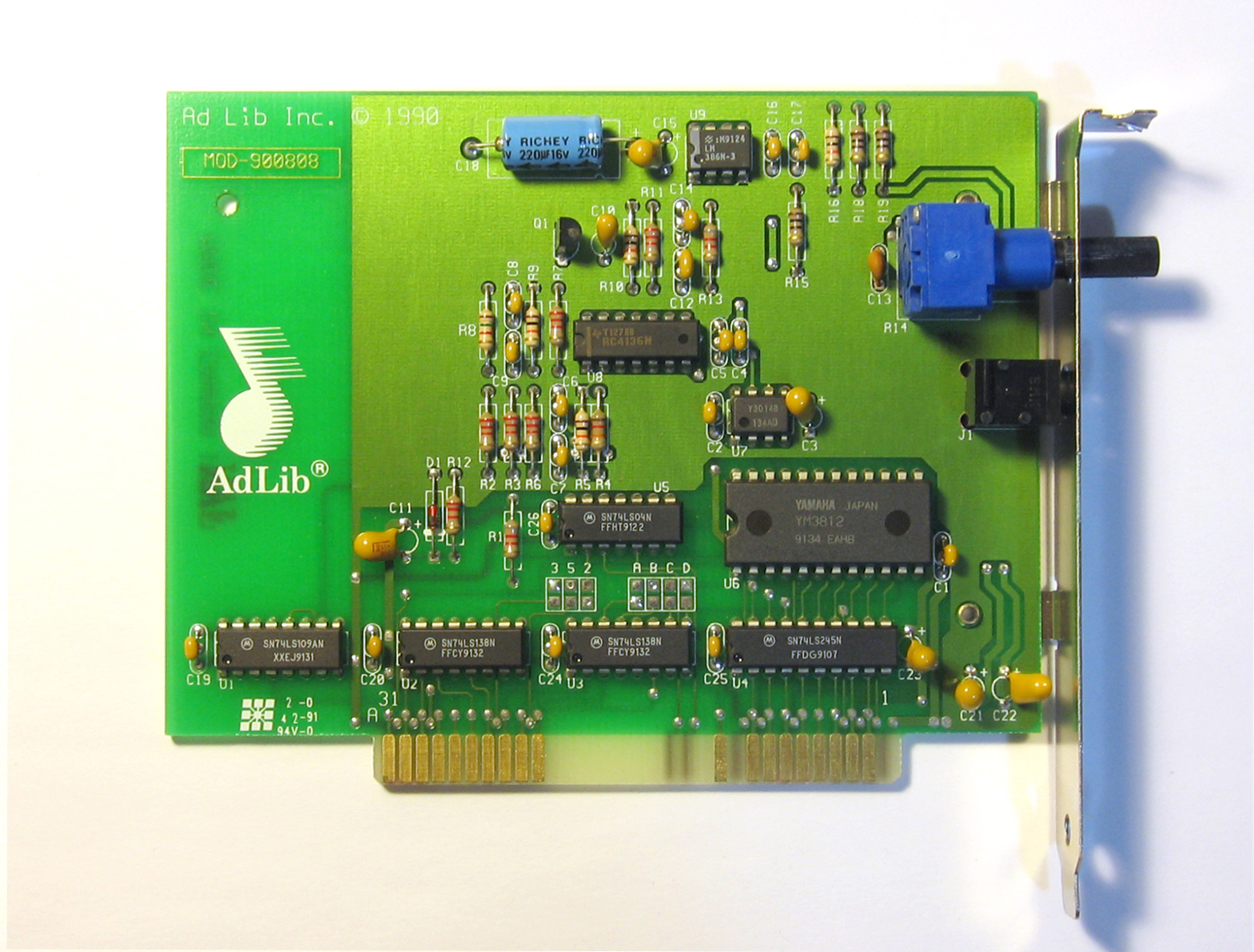
AdLib Music Synthesizer Card from 1990

AdLib also released a version of the AdLib sound card for IBM's MicroChannel architecture, the AdLib MCA, which used an MCA P82C611 interface IC. Notable updates for this MCA version was the use of a volume wheel, as the original potentiometer made the card too thick for the MCA standard.

=== AdLib Gold 1000 (1992) ===
Ad Lib planned a new proprietary standard before releasing the 12-bit stereo sound card called the AdLib Gold. The Gold 1000 used a later-generation Yamaha YMF262 (OPL3) and 12-bit digital PCM capability while retaining backward compatibility with OPL2 through the OPL3 chip. The onboard Yamaha YMZ263-F also performs 2× oversampling, which would affect the OPL3 output slightly. A surround-sound module was developed as an optional attachment that allowed a chorus surround effect to be enabled for OPL3 outputs; however, few programs supported it. One unique aspect is that it could be initialized for certain sounds and did not affect the entire output by default. Other optional attachments such as SCSI support and modem support were in development as well.

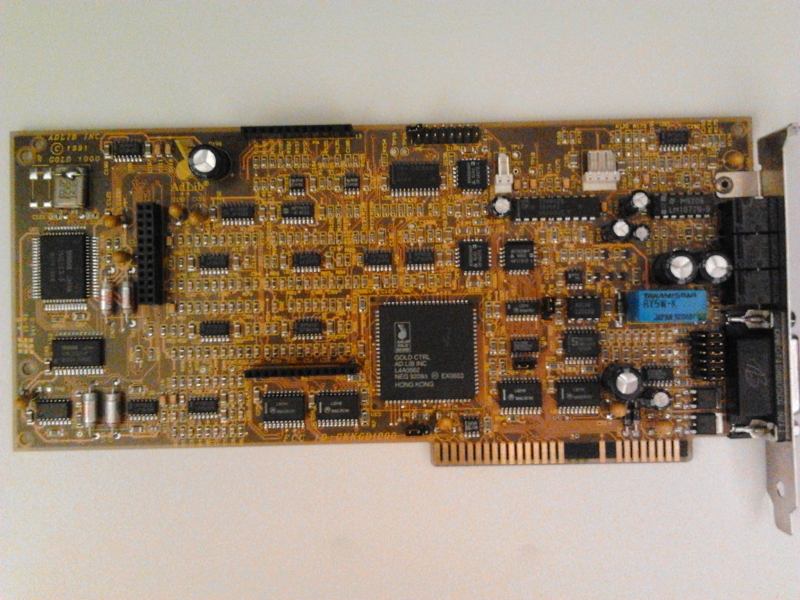
AdLib Gold 1000

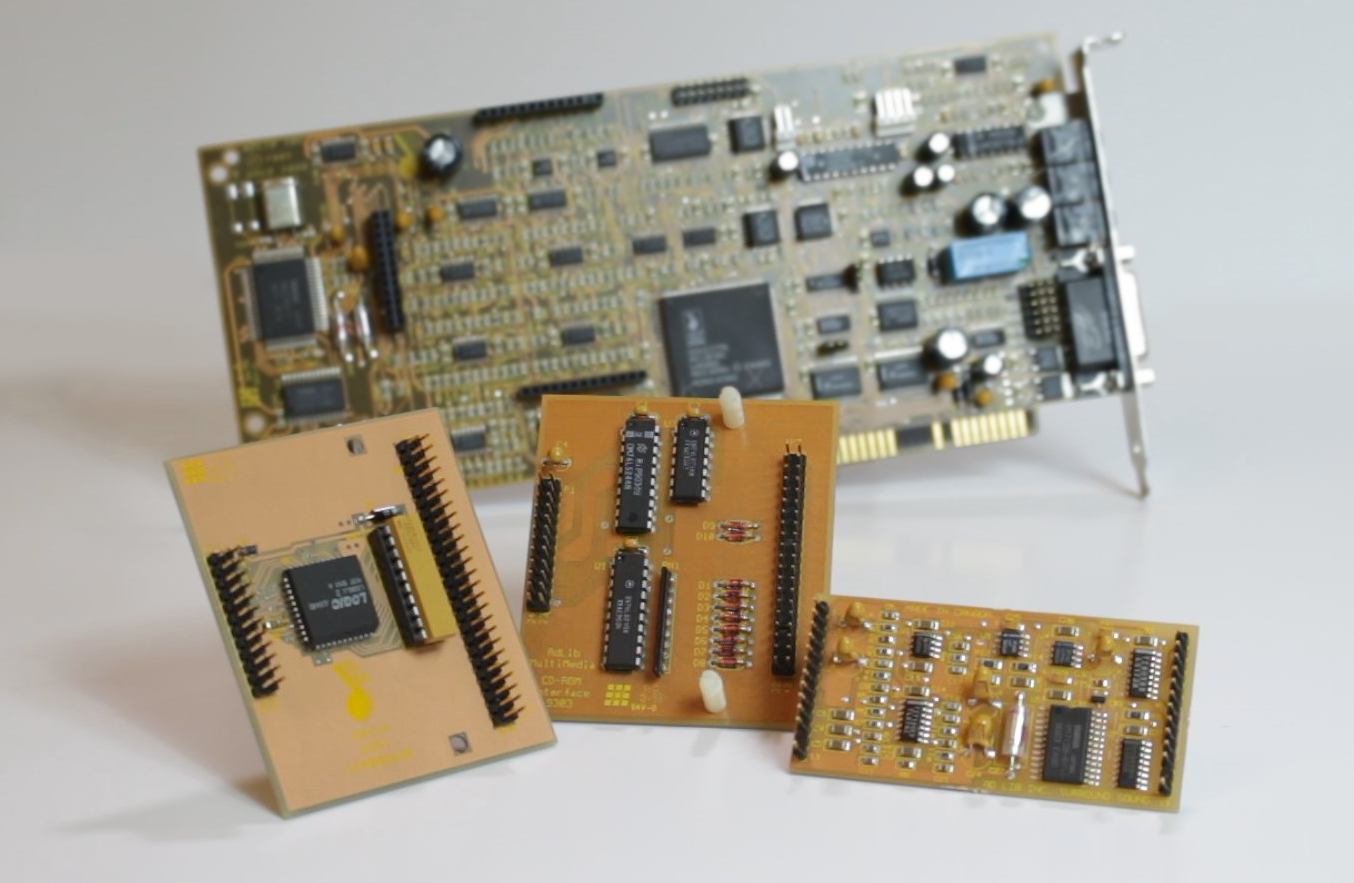
AdLib Gold sound card in the background, and the SCSI module, CD-ROM module and Surround module in the foreground

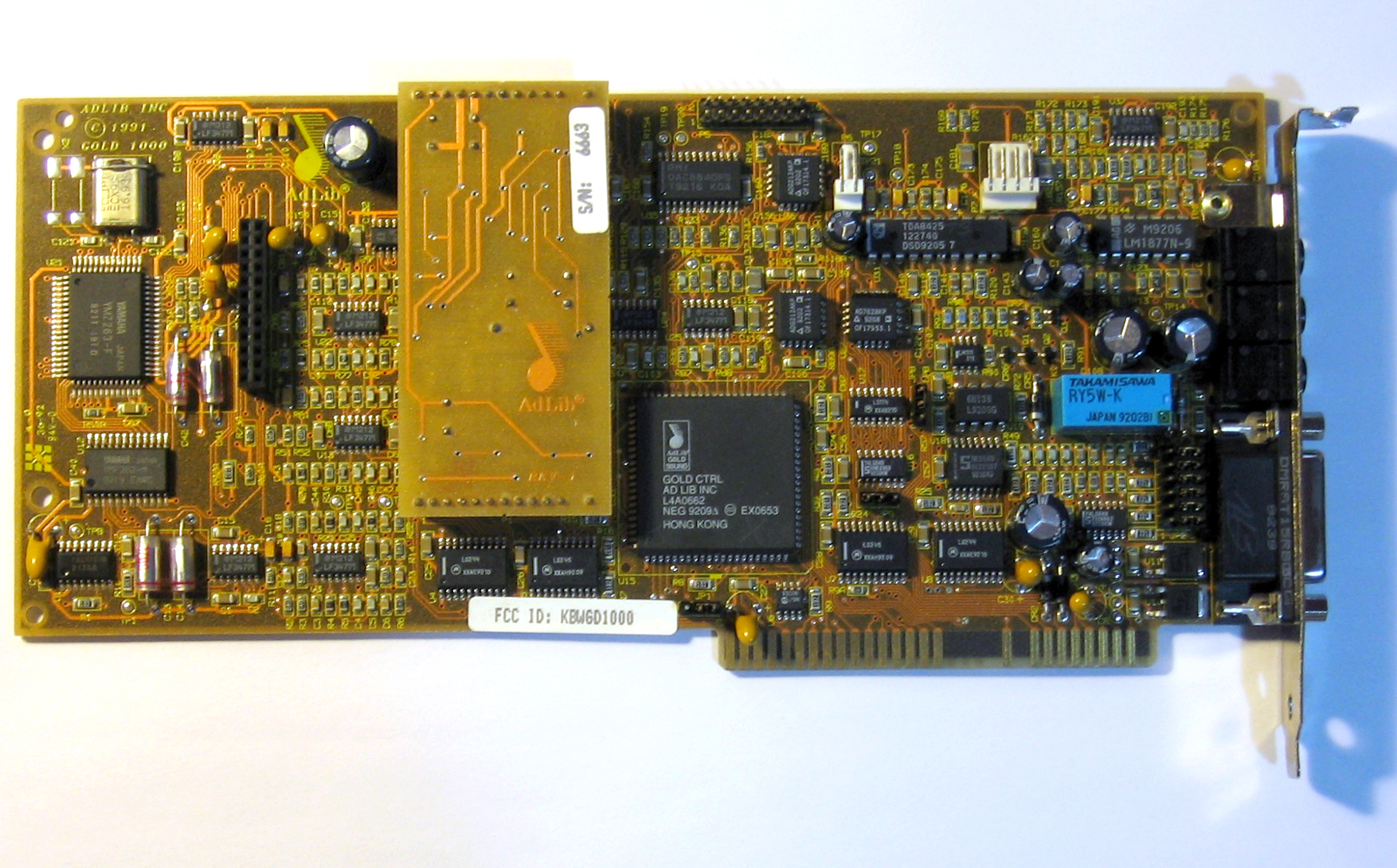
AdLib Gold 1000 with surround module

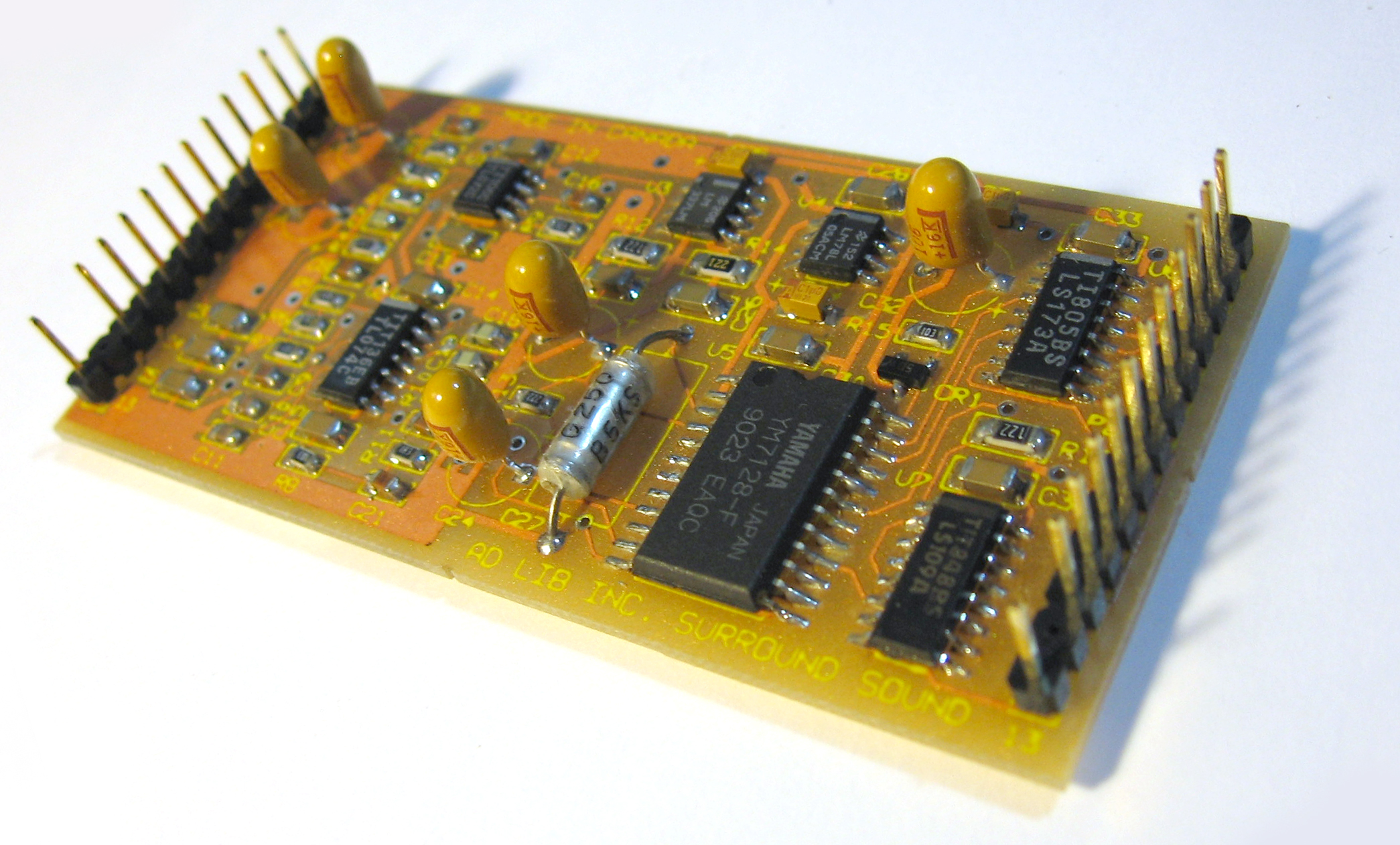
AdLib Gold 1000 surround module

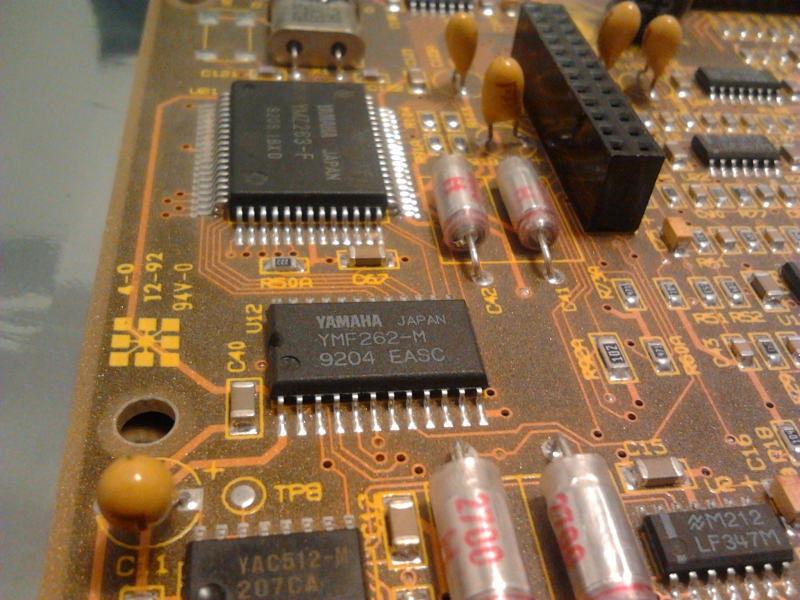
The YMF and YMZ Yamaha chips

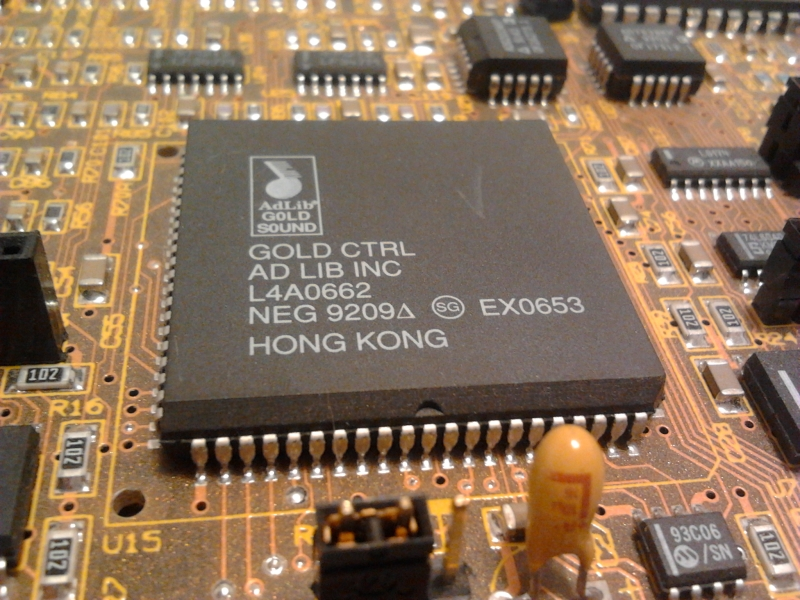
The main control chip

There is evidence of anti-competitive behavior by Creative in the failure of this card. Yamaha made parts for both Creative and AdLib, with Creative being Yamaha's biggest customer at the time. The chip that Yamaha created for the AdLib card continually failed to pass testing, while Creative's Yamaha chip passed. This enabled Creative to come to market first, shortly after which AdLib's chip passed testing, but it was too late for it to sustain itself.

Despite AdLib's efforts, the Gold 1000 failed to capture the market, and the company eventually went bankrupt due to cheaper alternatives such as the Creative Labs Sound Blaster 16. AdLib designed the Gold 1000 mainly in-house, as such, the Gold 1000's layout has a lot of discrete circuitry and many surface-mount components in a grid array. Creative Labs was able to integrate their sound cards more tightly to reduce cost.

AdLib had planned a secondary release of the Gold 1000, the Gold MC2000, which would have supported the MicroChannel bus. However, AdLib went bankrupt before the card could be produced.

== See also ==
- Creative Labs
- Sound card
- Innovation SSI-2001
