= Innovator potato =

Potato variety

Potato 'Innovator'
- Genus: Solanum
- Species: Solanum tuberosum
- Hybrid parentage: Shepody x RZ-84-2580
- Cultivar: Innovator
- Origin: Netherlands, and registered in 2004

Innovator is potato variety that is oblong in shape with a smooth skin. It is a popular potato variety in Europe and is gaining popularity in North America as a frying and baking potato. The skin of the potato variety is russeted, similar to that of a Russet Burbank potato. Innovator also has shallow eyes with a cream coloured flesh.

== Origin ==
Innovator was bred in the Netherlands and registered in 2004. It is the result of a cross between Shepody x RZ-84-2580.

== Uses ==
Due to the Innovator's dry matter content they are well suited for french fry making, boiling or baking.

== Botanical features ==
Innovator is a medium to large plant with stems that are semi erect. The leaves of the plants are a yellow green and are moderately close to one another. When the plant flowers it produces many white flowers. The variety produces tubers that are large and oblong in shape with a tan coloured skin. The potato variety also produces large sprouts that are red-violet in colour.

== Disease resistance ==
Innovator potatoes are resistant to potato wart and Globodera pallida (one of the two species of potato cyst nematode). It is also resistant to late foliar leaf blight, Potato virus X and Potato virus Y. The variety is slightly resistant to common scab and tuber late blight.
