= Innovation SSI-2001 =

Sound card for IBM PC compatible computers

Innovation SSI-2001 is a sound card for IBM PC compatible computers introduced by the Innovation Computer Corporation in 1989. Unique to its design was the use of the MOS Technology SID as its sound chip of choice.

== Description ==
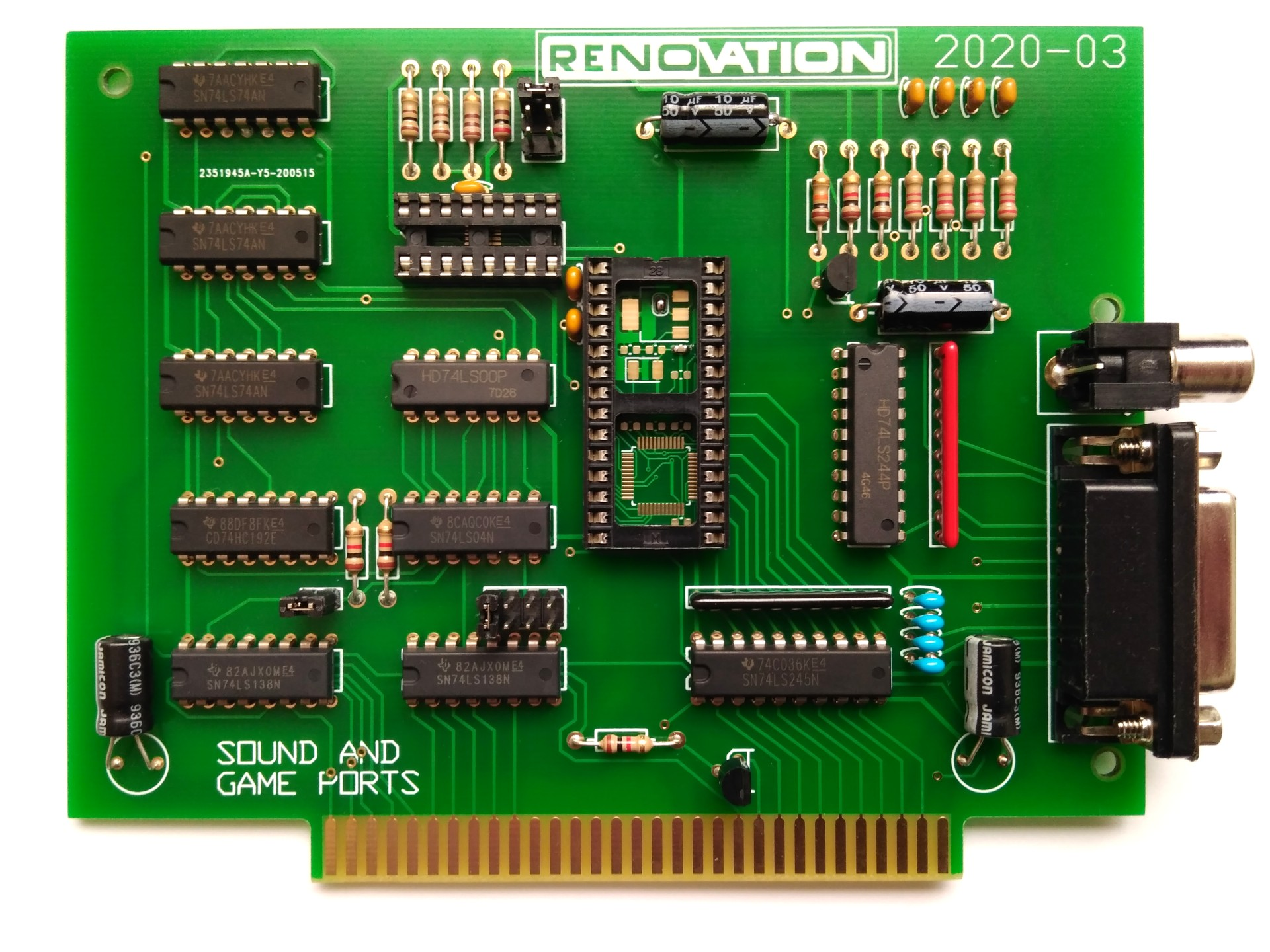
Modern replica of the Innovation SSI-2001 (Renovation SSI-2001)

The sound card was produced by Innovation Computer Corporation and was intended to compete with Adlib. It is an 8-bit ISA card, with a single mono RCA output connector and a game port. It has three groups of jumpers which enable or disable the game port, control its sensitivity and, change the card's base I/O port from the default 280_{hex} to 2A0_{hex}, 2C0_{hex} or 2E0_{hex}. During use, the card uses 32 I/O ports.

This sound card did not gain much popularity and was supported only by a few computer games. Lack of support led to the discontinuation of production, and many of the cards released were later disassembled to harvest the SID chips for the Commodore 64.

It is considered one of the rarest PC sound cards, with only about 10 copies of the original board known to exist worldwide. Since 2015, DIY replicas have been designed.

== Emulation ==
Reverse emulation is currently possible: the DOSBox emulator supports Innovation SSI-2001 emulation, without the presence of a real device.

== Links ==
- Innovation SSI-2001: the history of one of the rarest sound cards for the IBM PC (and its replica)
- Photographs of an SSI-2001 and a modern HardSID reproduction
