= Innovation (journal) =

Sociological academic journal

- Discipline: Sociology
- Language: English
- Edited by: Ronald J. Pohoryles, Hans-Liudger Dienel

Publication details
- Former name(s): Innovation in Social Sciences Research
- History: 1988–present
- Publisher: Taylor & Francis on behalf of the European Association for the Advancement of the Social Sciences
- Frequency: Quarterly
- Impact factor: 2.541 (2021)

Standard abbreviations
- ISO 4: Innovation
- NLM: Innovation (Abingdon)

Indexing
- ISSN: 1351-1610 (print); 1469-8412 (web)

Links
- Journal homepage; Online access; innovation Website

Innovation: The European Journal of Social Science Research is a quarterly peer-reviewed academic journal published by Taylor & Francis on behalf of the European Association for the Advancement of the Social Sciences, a non-profit research organization registered in Vienna. The editors are Ronald J. Pohoryles and Hans-Liudger Dienel.

The journal's main focus is on the sociology of management, innovation, sustainability and urban planning; it also publishes papers of general sociology and political science from a European perspective.

According to the Journal Citation Reports, in 2021 the journal has a two-year impact factor of 2.541, ranking it 59 out of 148 journals in the category "Sociology".
