= Innovation Computer =

Defunct American computer company

Innovation Computer Corporation
- Type: Public
- Industry: Computer
- Founded: 1979; 47 years ago in Cleveland, Wisconsin, United States
- Founder: Steve Voigt
- Defunct: c. 1996; 30 years ago
- Fate: Dissolution

Innovation Computer Corporation (formerly Innovation Company) was an American computer company based in the village of Cleveland, Wisconsin, and active from 1979 to the early 1990s. The company produced a number of clones of the IBM PC, as well as several expansions and peripherals, such as the SSI-2001 sound card. Innovation was one of the first American personal computer companies to do business with the Soviet Union in the late 1980s, shortly before its dissolution in 1991.

== History ==
=== Independent era (1979–1988) ===
Innovation was founded by Steve Voigt as Innovation Company in 1979 and incorporated in the village of Cleveland, Wisconsin, off the Interstate 43. Before founding Innovation, Voigt graduated from the University of Wisconsin–Milwaukee with a degree in applied science and engineering in the early 1970s. Shortly after, he gained employment at the Kohler Company in Wisconsin, founding their electronics division and becoming an executive at the company. In 1979, he founded Innovation as an electronics consulting firm and designer of circuit boards for industrial applications, chiefly doing business with firms in the Midwestern United States.

In around 1983, Innovation formed a joint venture with Bronson Electronics of Seymour, Wisconsin, and together they manufactured a color graphics card for the IBM Personal Computer. The two subcontracted manufacturing of the peripheral's circuit boards to various nearby fabricators, including Control Products of Grafton. Innovation's cards sold well, with ComputerLand, Leading Edge Products, and IBM reselling it and including it in their personal computers as value-adds between 1983 and 1986; the company reportedly made $4 million in revenue in 1985. In January 1986, ComputerLand of Hayward, California, commissioned Innovation for the design of an IBM PC compatible. Innovation found raising the capital necessary to produce the computer difficult—in Voight's words, "a suicidal attempt"—on account of the skepticism of local investors in raising a high-technology firm in that area of Wisconsin. Unable to manufacture a computer with ComputerLand's specified timeframe, ComputerLand ended up purchasing Innovation's design and had manufacturing outsourced in East Asia. ComputerLand's version of Innovation's PC design was branded the BC-88 and resold at ComputerLand's retail locations.

In July 1986, by which point the company had only 10 employees, Innovation finally received $1.2 million in capital from Steve Einhorn, an investor from Milwaukee. Immediately after the capital infusion, Innovation began moving into nearby Sheboygan, Wisconsin, ultimately leasing a warehouse formerly owned by the Hipke Packing Corporation in which to assemble computers. Although slated for an August 1986 release, their first computer, the 1010 XT, did not ship until June 1987. The 1010 XT specced according to IBM's PC XT but featured a unique backplane design: instead of a motherboard, the computer's processors and critical support circuitry instead reside on an expansion card that slots into one of eight available ISA slots. The computer supports both the standard 4.77 MHz operation of the original IBM PC as well as an 8 MHz turbo mode. Also cutting-edge for the time, the computer comes with a robust hardware configuration and diagnostic utility in the BIOS, bringing it closer to plug-and-play functionality than most PC clones of the era. As ComputerLand had done with the BC-88, Innovation had the 1010 XT manufactured overseas, in South Korea. The New York Times gave the 1010 XT a positive review, and by August 1987, Innovation was selling over 500 units a month. Innovation succeeded the 1010 XT with the 2010 AT Personal Workstation, based on IBM's PC AT.

Innovation repurposed their processor-on-a-card technology for an expansion for Leading Edge's Model D. Called the Innovation D-Z, the card takes over the Model D's stock 4.77-MHz Intel 8088 and runs the computer off an 7.8 MHz compatible processor; a key combination allows the processor board to revert to the stock clock speed. In April 1988, they released a line of "upgrade kits" allowing users to replace the motherboard of their existing IBM PC or compatible with the 1010 XT backplane and the customer's choice of processor card. Innovation sold these kits on the basis of future-proofing the customer's existing computer investments. The upgrade kit line included the 1010P (upgrading original PC-class systems to the XT); the 2010P (upgrading PC-class systems to the AT and its 80286 processor); the 2010I (upgrading XT-class systems to AT); and the 3020I (upgrading AT-class systems to i386).

=== Merger era (1988 – 1990s) ===
Between February 1988 and May 1988, Innovation merged three ways with two other companies: first with software developer New Software International of Attleboro, Massachusetts, and later with systems integrator California Microelecronics of Campbell, California. All three companies had nascent plans to supply computer products to the Soviet Union, which had difficulty supplying advanced personal computers for itself around the late 1980s. This merger was worked out both to effectively gain more capital for the three companies and to allow the companies to more efficiently supply computer products to ELORG, a state-owned organization that was the computer trading arm of the Soviet Union's Ministry of Foreign Trade. The resulting joint venture became known as Elorg Soft, with Innovation supplying the kit of computer components for factories in the Soviet Union to assemble.

New Software eventually instigated a de-merger of the three companies, however, seeking another group of companies to do business with. By October 1988, the companies were once again independent. In November 1988, Innovation reverse-merged with a holding company in Boston to form Innovation International. The Boston-based company, owned by Frank G. Wright, had also been interested in Soviet computer trading. With the reverse merger, Innovation gained $8 million in capital to expand their lease and accommodate more production lines at their Cleveland headquarters.

In December 1988, Innovation unveiled two 286-based desktop computers, the 2000 ST and the 2000 ET. The 2000 ET was a conventional pizza-box-style desktop computer with 3.5-inch floppy disk drives, while the 2000 ST was a very-small-form-factor computer enclosed in a 2.5 by 6 by 15 inches (6.4 by 15.2 by 38.1 cm) case. The 2000 ST (nicknamed the Stealth PC) featured a matte black finish and a flat-panel, monochrome plasma display (measuring 8 by 11 by 3 in) with a reticulating metal arm reminiscent of a Luxo lamp and standing base that could optionally be mounted to a wall or affixed to a corner of a desk. This Luxo-esque design predated Apple's similarly designed iMac G4 by 14 years.

In mid-1989, the company released the SSI-2001 sound card for the IBM PC. Also known as the Innovation Sound Standard, the SSI-2001 is notable for featuring a MOS Technology 6581 "SID" as the sound chip of choice. The so-called SID chip was primarily the domain of the Commodore 64 microcomputer, which despite lacking in processing power compared to the IBM PCs and compatibles of the late 1980s was still lauded for its far superior sound-generating capability. The SSI-2001 received high accolades in Byte and Compute! magazines.

In November 1988, Innovation International formed a joint venture with NPO Energia of Moscow called I3C (pronounced I Cubed C), which sold Innovation's computers to various organizations in the Soviet Union. Innovation received its first order via I3C from the Institute for Automated Systems, a Soviet information technology firm. Innovation later received a $6.5-million order for 80286-powered laptops via I3C, to be used in Mir, the Soviet Union's last low-orbit space station. The Soviets placed another order worth $2 million for Innovation's laptops in March 1991, shortly before their dissolution in December that year. Voigt continued to work with the Russian Federation in the succeeding decades under his successor company American Innovation. Innovation let the rights to their namesake lapse in 1996, by which the company was defunct. For his contributions to space technology, the Russian Federation awarded Voigt with a medallion in the 1990s, sharing this honor with Gorbachev and Ronald Reagan.
