= Outcome-driven innovation =

Strategy for customer-defined value creation

Outcome-driven innovation (ODI) is a strategy and innovation process developed by Anthony W. Ulwick. It is built around the theory that people buy products and services to get jobs done. As people complete these jobs, they have certain measurable outcomes that they are attempting to achieve. It links a company's value creation activities to customer-defined metrics.

Ulwick found that previous innovation practices were ineffective because they were incomplete, overlapping, or unnecessary. ODI attempts to identify jobs and outcomes that are either important but poorly served or unimportant but over-served. ODI focuses on customer-desired outcome rather than demographic profile in order to segment markets and offer well-targeted products. By knowing how customers measure value, companies are able to align the actions of marketing, development, and R&D with these metrics and systematically create customer value.

== Origin ==
Ulwick was granted the first of twelve patents on the ODI process in 1999. In late 1999, Ulwick claims to have introduced ODI to Clayton Christensen. Christensen mentions examples of Ulwick and Richard Pedi of Gage Foods with the way of thinking about market structure used in the chapter "What Products Will Customers Want to Buy?" in his Innovator's Solution and called "jobs to be done" or "outcomes that customers are seeking".

Instead of assuming what their customers want or need, typically product developers determine the voice of the customer (VOC). ODI takes VOC a step further by focusing on jobs-to-be-done rather than product improvements. The objective is to translate customers’ needs into products or services they can’t live without. ODI theory posits that companies typically collect the wrong kinds of input from their customers, and states that all the company should find out is what the customers’ ultimate output goal is: what they want the product or service to do for them, not how it should do it. The goal of the method is to help companies discover new product and service opportunities.

According to Ulwick, ODI is the culmination of 20 years of studying innovation methodology. In 2002, it was introduced in the Harvard Business Review, and expanded upon in Ulwick's 2005 book, What Customers Want: Using Outcome-Driven Innovation to Create Breakthrough Products and Services.

In 2016, Ulwick published Jobs to be Done: From Theory to Practice to explain the process for converting "Jobs Theory" to practice.

== Opportunity algorithm ==
Ulwick's "opportunity algorithm" measures and ranks innovation opportunities. Standard gap analysis looks at the simple difference between importance and satisfaction metrics; Ulwick's formula gives twice as much weight to importance as to satisfaction: importance + max(importance-satisfaction,0), where importance and satisfaction are the proportion of high survey responses. The opportunity algorithm formula is as follows: Importance + (Importance-Satisfaction) = Opportunity. Customers use a 1-to-10 scale to quantify the importance of each desired outcome and the degree to which it is currently satisfied. The rankings are inserted into the formula to form the overall innovation opportunity score that highlights the outcomes with the highest “importance” scores and lowest “satisfaction” scores.

== See also ==
- New product development
