= Ensoniq Soundscape S-2000 =

PC sound card

Ensoniq Soundscape Ad

Soundscape S-2000 was Ensoniq's first direct foray into the PC sound card market. The card arrived on the market in 1994. It is a full-length ISA digital audio and sample-based synthesis device, equipped with a 2 MiB Ensoniq-built ROM-based patch set. Some OEM versions of the card feature a smaller 1 MiB patch set. It was praised for its then-high quality music synthesis and sound output, high compatibility and good software support.

== Hardware overview ==
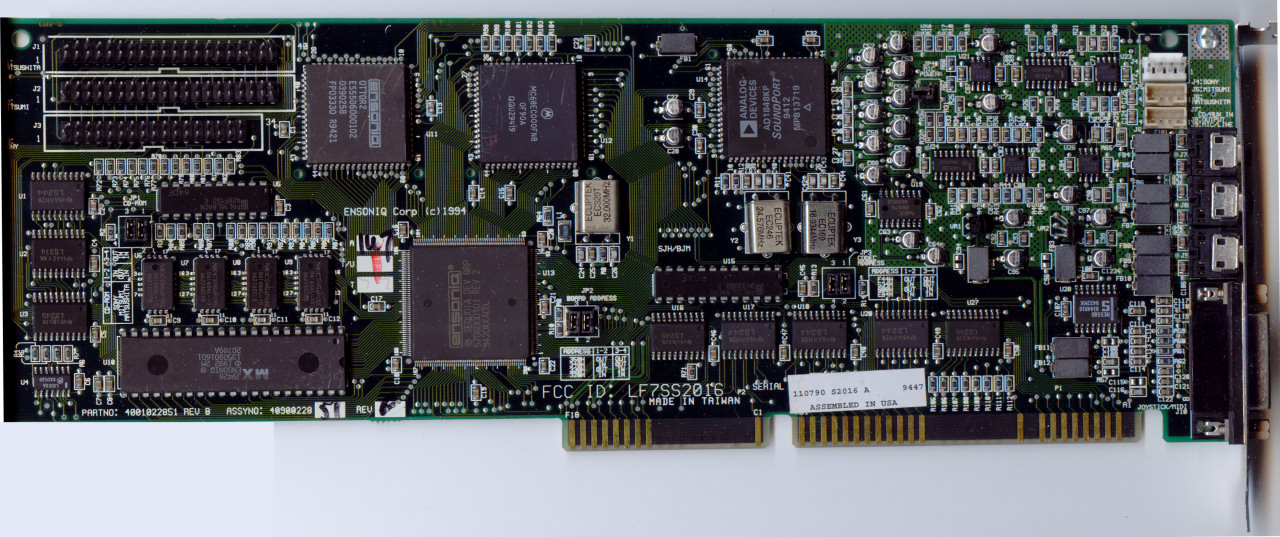
Soundscape S-2000 Rev. 1

Ensoniq advertisements for the Soundscape stated "Finally, A Sound Card from a company that knows sound!", claiming that "the same wavetable technology that drives our $3,000 keyboards is available for your PC". The card uses an 'OTTO' synthesizer chip with a companion 'Sequoia' chip for MIDI duties, along with a Motorola 68EC000 8 MHz controller (a low-cost variant of the ubiquitous 68000 with selectable bus width) and a small amount of RAM. Although it has RAM, the card does not support uploading of sound samples for the synthesizer. The on-board coprocessor was a much-advertised feature of the card, marketed to reduce the overhead of music synthesis through the device. Digital-to-analog audio conversion was handled by an Analog Devices CODEC such as the AD1848, which was capable of sampling at up to 48 kHz. The Soundscape S-2000's sample-based synthesizer lacked an effects processor, meaning digital effects such as reverb and chorus were not supported.

Advertisements also mentioned the card's three CD-ROM interface connectors. As was common with multimedia cards produced in the mid-90s, a variety of proprietary interfaces were supported. This was necessary as ATAPI IDE CD-ROM drives were not yet common, and the majority of optical drives produced required one of the many proprietary interfaces that were prevalent at the time. In addition, the majority of PCs purchased typically had only a single IDE channel, which might already be controlling two hard drives or a hard drive and a tape/disc backup device, so offering additional CD-ROM interfaces was often convenient to the consumer.

One advantage compared to competitors was that the card did not require terminate-and-stay-resident programs (TSRs), minimizing its conventional memory footprint. The card loaded its own operating system into the onboard RAM during system initialization via the card's 'SSINIT.EXE' utility program. The Soundscape also has a hardware MPU-401 implementation which, combined with the lack of TSRs, allowed a high degree of compatibility, which was a significant benefit as many DOS games often ran in a custom flavor of protected mode or were particularly demanding of conventional memory space.

Soundscape S-2000 has several descendants, including the SoundscapeDB, Soundscape Elite, Soundscape OPUS, Soundscape VIVO90, and AudioPCI. The original Soundscape S-2000 was replaced by the Soundscape II, a board based on the ELITE but without the daughtercard (it was an upgrade option).

== Compatibility ==
The Soundscape was compatible with a variety of popular sound standards such as Ad Lib, Creative Sound Blaster 2.0, Microsoft Windows Sound System, General MIDI, Roland MT-32 (though with different instrument sounds) and MPU-401, in addition to its own, well-supported native Soundscape mode. Of critical importance at the time was support of the Creative Labs Sound Blaster, a card that was the ubiquitous sound standard of the day. Soundscape can emulate the Sound Blaster 2.0, an 8-bit monaural device with FM synthesis capability. While the digital sound emulation was quite good, the FM synthesis emulation leaves much to be desired. Emulating FM synthesis through software was too demanding for the CPUs of the time (typically an 80486), and so Ensoniq wrapped most of the FM synthesis commands to the card's sample-based synthesis engine, meaning that FM music did not sound correct because it was composed with FM synthesis in mind, not real instruments. This could be especially poor if the game was an older title that used FM synthesis for sound effects.

The reasoning behind using emulation instead of real hardware was cost and demand. FM synthesis hardware support for games at the time required an additional chip, the Yamaha OPL-2 or OPL-3. At the time Soundscape arrived, most games supported General MIDI output, offering high-quality music support for users who purchased the card and reducing the need for said OPL-3 synthesis chip. The board's SoundBlaster support could be toggled on and off, allowing use of a second sound card (usually an existing sound device) to take care of the actual OPL-3 FM synthesis if desired. The advantage of a single card that could do either, however, was very important for mind share amongst consumers, and was critical for OEM system sellers because adding a separate card would add cost to the system.

== Software support ==
The SoundScape was well-supported by many mid-to-late 1990s programs, both directly and via General MIDI. Ensoniq released drivers for many operating systems, including IBM OS/2, MS-DOS, Microsoft Windows 3.1, Windows 95, and Windows NT. Ensoniq later released Microsoft DirectSound-capable drivers as well. In these operating systems, programs accessed the sound card through its driver, allowing full hardware support without the need for the software developer to support the card directly.
