= Ensoniq ESQ-1 =

Synthesizer

ESQ-1
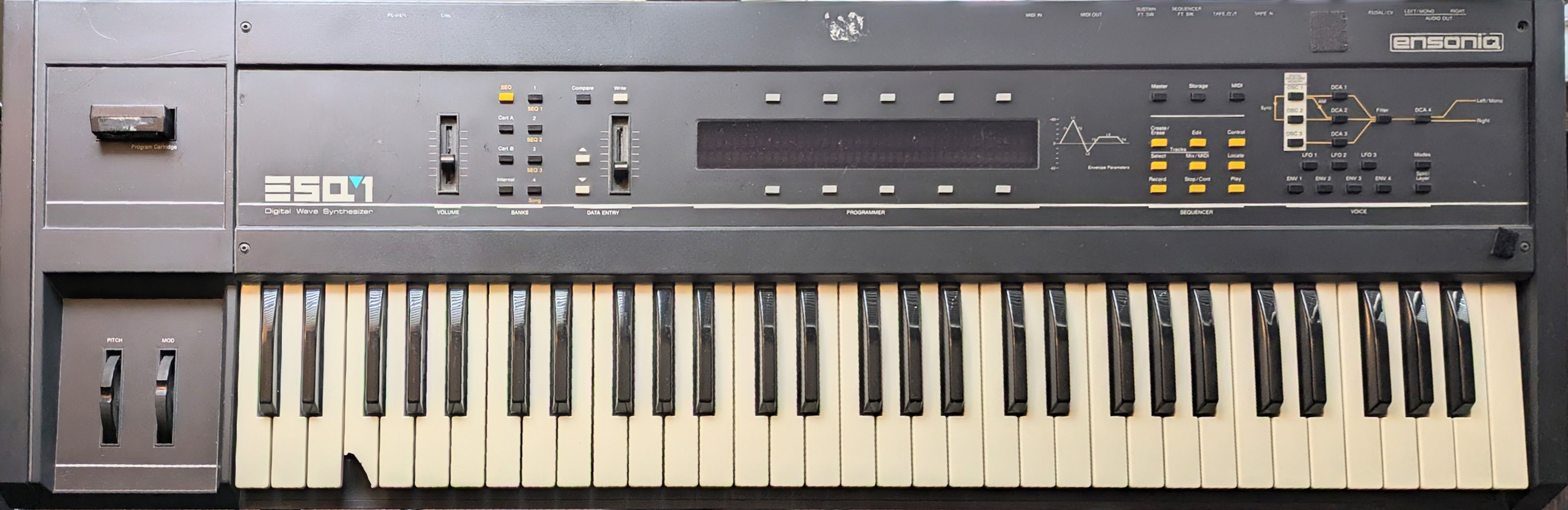
- The Ensoniq ESQ-1 synthesizer with an installed memory cartridge
- Manufacturer: Ensoniq
- Dates: 1986 - 1988
- Price: $1,395 original MSRP

Technical specifications
- Polyphony: 8 voices, 3 oscillators each
- Timbrality: 9
- Oscillator: 24 total, 8-bit digital PCM and single-cycle wavetable-lookup
- LFO: 3 (triangle, saw, square and noise)
- Synthesis type: subtractive
- Filter: 1 analog resonant low-pass per voice
- Attenuator: 4 VCA (3 DCA, 1 VCA); Envelope - Four levels, four rates
- Storage memory: 40 patches internal 80 extra with an expansion card
- Effects: None

Input/output
- Keyboard: 61 keys, velocity sensitive
- External control: MIDI

Ensoniq ESQ-1 is a 61-key, velocity sensitive, eight-note polyphonic and multitimbral synthesizer released by Ensoniq in 1985. It was marketed as a "digital wave synthesizer" but was an early music workstation. Although its voice generation is typically subtractive in much the same fashion as most analog synthesizers that preceded it, its oscillators are neither voltage nor digitally controlled, but true digital oscillators, provided by a custom Ensoniq wavetable chip. The signal path includes analog resonant low-pass filters and an analog amplifier.

The synth also features a fully functional, 8-track MIDI sequencer that can run either its internal sounds, external MIDI equipment, or both, with a capacity of 2,400 notes (expandable via cartridges). It provides quantization, step-editing, primitive forms of copy/paste editing, and can be synchronized with external MIDI or tape-in clock.

The ESQ-1 had a particularly easy user interface, especially for a feature-filled digital synthesizer of the time and a multitimbral workstation/sequencer, by way of a then-large 40-character × 2-line display, ten softkeys (5 above and 5 below display), and system of all dedicated direct-access buttons per ten-parameter/patch page, meaning there was no "menu diving" within a hierarchical series of sub-pages.

The ESQ-1 can store 40 rewritable sound patches internally, and features a rewritable EEPROM or fixed ROM cartridge slot for access to 80 additional patches. The ESQ-M, a rackmount version of the synthesizer, was released circa 1987, with the same specifications but without the sequencer and a significantly smaller display and less user-friendly interface.

Notably, the sound chip at the core of the synth, the 5503 Digital Oscillator Chip (DOC), was designed by Robert Yannes, designer of the popular Commodore SID chip. The chip was previously used in Ensoniq's Mirage sampler, later in ESQ-1's enhanced successor the SQ-80, as well as the Apple IIGS personal computer.

== Voicing ==
The ESQ-1 features eight voices with three oscillators per voice, and is fully multi-timbral. Despite eight-voice polyphony, it is capable of tracking nine voices - when using eight internal sounds in the sequencer, one additional internal or cartridge sound can be controlled independently. The wave ROM contains 32 different waveforms, including standard synthesis waveforms such as sawtooth and square, but also less usual ones such as "piano", "voice", or "bass" (note that, although multi-sampled, these are still single-cycle waveforms, not true samples as such).

Each oscillator can be independently volume-controlled via its dedicated digitally-controlled amplifier, and modulated. Oscillator amplifiers provide room to be overdriven, and thus produce moderate analog distortion as an additional effect on, for example, synth leads or organ sounds.

ESQ-1 has three independent LFOs, and three independent envelope generators which can be programmed to modulate any number of parameters. The fourth envelope generator is hardwired to the main output amplifier, though it can still be used as a modulation source for other parameters as well. The output amplifier (DCA4) also provides programmable panning for each voice. Its envelope generators allow numerical level/rate settings, and like many other synthesis parameters, allow the use of negative values. Furthermore, they can be set to track for keyboard velocity and alter the attack segment of the envelope (enabling a voice to have a soft attack when played softly or vice versa), and note position to alter envelope length (for instance, on a piano sound, having shorter notes higher up the keyboard).

Its low-pass filters are analog (CEM 3379), but digitally controlled, and thus can be modulated with a significant number of sources, including LFO, envelopes, velocity, aftertouch, modulation wheel, etc. Even though the filter resonance can be driven to extreme effect, the resonance setting features only 32 steps, and the filters do not fully self-oscillate. The ESQ-1's keybed doesn't feature aftertouch, but the synthesis engine is capable of processing polyphonic aftertouch over MIDI, such as the polyphonic aftertouch implementation of the SQ-80's keyboard.

Furthermore, Ensoniq ESQ-1 features amplitude modulation, oscillator sync, monophonic mode, and portamento.

== Voice programming ==
Each section of the synthesizer is called to screen via a dedicated button, and settings inside each category are made by using one data slider or two +/- buttons. Settings do not influence the sound directly, but rather, changes are heard only when the next note is played. In other words, one can't use the data slider to change the filter cutoff setting as a way of producing a filter sweep, but can use any of the modulation sources to the same effect (including envelopes, the modulation wheel, modulation pedal, or external controllers over MIDI). Any modulation source can be set up to modulate any page of any given program (such as OSC1, DCA1, Filter, etc.). Voices are organized in four banks, and all presets can be overwritten by the user, and exported as banks via the tape-out port in the form of audio-encoded data, thus making it easy to store any number of user-created banks on tape or, for example, a computer. Additionally, it has a cartridge slot for voice cartridges. Commercial cartridges come with two sets of four banks of voices each, but there are also blank or rewritable cartridges.

== Sequencing ==
ESQ-1 has an eight-track sequencer, which can be set to use any of the internal or cartridge sounds, or alternatively set to MIDI output channel for any track separately, while still being able to control a local voice on that track as well. The mixer section provides volume control for local sounds. MIDI output sends program changes, and the sequencer records continuous controller data such as pitch and modulation wheel use. The sequencer capacity can be expanded with additional cartridges. Events can be recorded in real-time (playing the keyboard or using any of the controllers with the optional use of an integrated metronome with pre-count), or step by step. Recorded data can be quantized, and tracks can be merged and copied. Changes and edits can be auditioned non-destructively. The sequencer can be set to slave or master clock, via MIDI or tape, and optionally controlled for play, record and punch-in via a footswitch. Sequences of up to 999 bars can be chained to "songs", with a programmable number of repetitions for each, or sequenced live, since a currently selected sequence will play only after the previous one ends. Each "sequence" can use a different tempo.

== See also ==
- Ensoniq SQ-80
