= Ensoniq Soundscape Elite =

1995 sound card for IBM PC compatibles

- Soundscape Elite logo

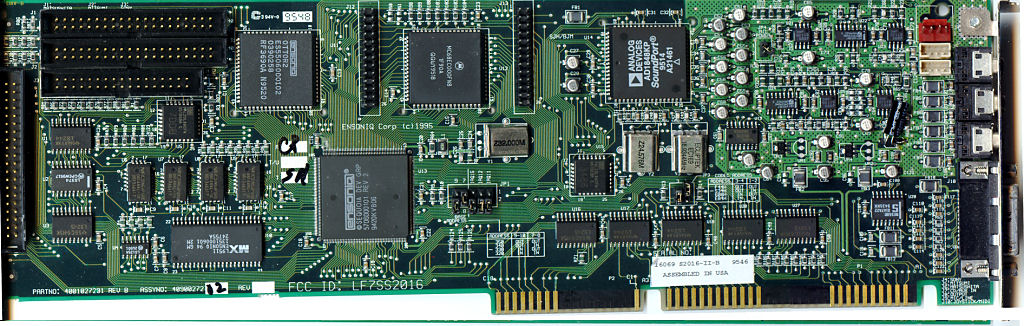
- ELITE without ESP
- Manufacturer: Ensoniq
- Introduced: March 1995; 31 years ago
- Type: Sound card

Soundscape Elite was Ensoniq's high-end ISA sound card which was launched in March 1995. It offered the highest MIDI quality of any sound card Ensoniq produced for IBM PC compatibles. The board is an evolution of the company's previous Soundscape S-2000.

== Overview ==
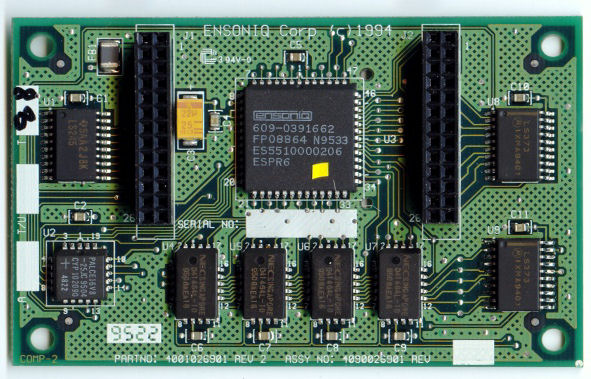
ESP daughtercard

The card's layout is similar to the Soundscape S-2000, and uses the same synthesizer chips and codecs. Changes include a revision of the 2 MiB patch ROM equipped with new sounds, and the addition of a powerful digital signal processor (DSP) daughtercard. This DSP, called the Ensoniq Signal Processor (ESP), allows popular enhancement effects to be applied to the Elite's patch sounds. The ESP was used on Ensoniq's musical instruments as well, such as their ASR samplers, TS synthesizers, and the DP Series effects processors. The most popular effects used are reverb and chorus, which are enabled by default on the card. The ESP is also fully configurable through a Windows utility (the "ENSONIQ Effects Tool Kit") and standard sysex commands. The Effects Tool Kit never progressed beyond the beta development stage.

Soundscape ELITE, like the original Soundscape, has several connections for the proprietary CD-ROM interfaces of the time. However, instead of the Soundscape S-2000's Mitsumi, Matsushita, and Sony interfaces, the Elite gained a new IDE ATAPI interface which was a new standard implemented to improve the ease of utilizing CD-ROM drives. The board's chipset consists of Ensoniq's OTTO and Sequoia synthesizer chips with the Motorola 68EC000 8 MHz controller, the ESP board, and an Analog Devices 1848KP codec for digital audio.

== Specifications ==
- Ensoniq "OTTO" Wavetable synthesizer (sample-based synthesizer). Provides true simultaneous instruments, 16 channels, 32-note polyphony. 2 MiB compressed wave and patch sets provide:
  - GS instrument set, 7 drum kits, 128 General MIDI instruments, MT-32 instruments, 61 drum programs
- Ensoniq "ESP" Signal Processor. Provides multiple simultaneous effects. Reverb and chorus are enabled when Soundscape is initialized.
- On-Board 68EC000 microprocessor. Provides software upgradeable OS and very low host CPU overhead.
- Edge connectors:
  - MIC/line Input
  - CD/AUX Input
  - Audio output
  - 15-Pin Joystick/MPU 401 MIDI interface
- Full 16-Bit digital play/record at up to 48 kHz stereo: CD Quality sound, very low noise
  - MS ADPCM, A-Law, u-Law Compression supported (except Sound Blaster ADPCM)
- Four CD-ROM interfaces:
  - IDE ATAPI (with programmable base port)
  - SONY proprietary
  - Mitsumi proprietary
  - Panasonic proprietary
- System requirements
  - IBM PC-AT or compatible, one 16-bit ISA expansion slot (full length)
  - 4MB RAM, MS-DOS 3.3 or higher, Windows 3.xx, Windows 95, Windows NT, or OS/2
- Support for AdLib, Sound Blaster and Sound Blaster 2.0 (except for the few software titles requiring SoundBlaster ADPCM), MT-32, General MIDI, Windows Sound System 2, MPC levels 1 and 2.
