= 112dB =

- Industry: Music software
- Founded: Utrecht (2005)
- Founder: Claude Climer; Jules Vleugels
- Headquarters: Utrecht, Netherlands
- Key people: Jules Vleugels (CEO); Leo Degen; Martijn Zwartjes
- Products: Morgana; Redline Series; SampLink
- Parent: Independent
- Website: 112db.com

112 dB is a music software company whose products are mainly aimed at electronic musicians.

== History ==
112 dB was founded in 2005 by Claude Climer (who left the company in 2008) and Jules Vleugels. Their first product was Morgana, an emulation of the Ensoniq Mirage hardware sampler. In 2009, Martijn Zwartjes (Apple, Native Instruments) and Leo Degen (Apple, Dolby Labs, Native Instruments) joined the company. Their base of operations is in Utrecht.

Vleugels died on January 23, 2011.

=== Product history ===
- 2007
  - Morgana, an emulation of the Ensoniq Mirage hardware sampler (awarded Innovation Award by Computer Music magazine).
  - SampLink, a routing utility that allows audio to be recorded into Morgana.
- 2009
  - Redline Monitor, a near-field monitor simulation for mixing and mastering on headphones.
  - Redline Reverb, an algorithmic true-stereo reverb.
  - Redline Equalizer, a variable-phase equalizer with adjustable harmonic distortion and a number of EQ boost/cut curves.
- 2010
  - Redline Preamp, a harmonic distortion plugin emulating an analogue preamp.
