= Ensoniq Fizmo =

Fizmo
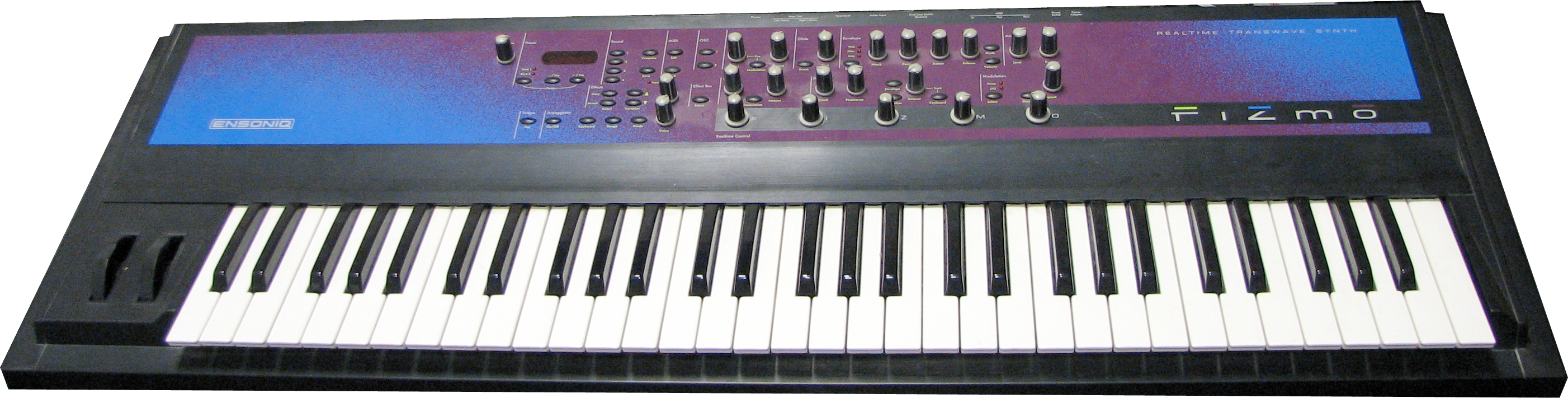
- Manufacturer: Ensoniq
- Dates: 1998

Technical specifications
- Polyphony: 48 voices
- Oscillator: 2 per preset, 8 simultaneous
- LFO: 8
- Synthesis type: Sample-based synthesis
- Filter: HPF, LPF, BPF
- Storage memory: 128 ROM sounds, 128 RAM sounds, 64 presets
- Effects: 41 types

Input/output
- Keyboard: 61-key semi-weighted
- External control: MIDI

The Ensoniq Fizmo was a synthesizer developed by Ensoniq. Developed in 1998, the Fizmo uses a Digital Acoustic simulation Transwave with 4 MB of ROM, up to four voices per preset, each voice with two oscillators, independent LFOs and FX: 48 voices maximum, with three separate fx units (24-bit VLSI effects with 41 algorithms) built in for further sound sculpting. The Fizmo featured 61 keys, and responded to velocity, channel aftertouch, as well as allowing the sounds to be split by velocity and keyboard position (note). The name F-I-Z-M-O was mapped across five control knobs just above the keyboard keys, allowing real-time modulation of the waves for more user controlled evolving sounds than a usual synthesizer could provide, as well as also having 17 dedicated Sound and Effect editing knobs for further sound design and editing.

The F-I-Z-M-O knobs did the following:

• F: Effect modulation. • I: Wave modulation. • Z: Filter cutoff. • M: Oscillator detuning. • O: Varies from Preset to Preset. (Sys4 mod)

== Sound ==
The Fizmo's sound can be described as post-modernistic and ambient. When editing patches it has a tendency to give an 80s-style atmospheric sound. Its major strength is generally agreed to be on its ability to generate complex evolving pads and its arpeggiator. With sufficient adjustment, the Fizmo can be used for bass lines and sound effects though users may find this less intuitive than with more application-specific synthesizers.

== Capabilities ==
- 128 presets
- 64 performances
- Vocoder with mini mic/line input
- 22 modulation sources, 8 destinations
- LFO with seven waveforms, syncable to arpeggiator or external clock
- Digital four-pole resonant low-pass filters, variable key tracking
- Three multi-segment envelope generators

== Public Reception ==
The Fizmo received much criticism over its short commercial lifetime for its unreliable power supply, unpolished operating system, idiosyncratic patch editing, and a general misunderstanding of its concept and sound. Its display is limited to a four-character seven-segment display, alienating users with unhelpful abbreviations. Further, external software is required to access the full set of features (such as the envelope generators, arpeggiator patterns, and effects). In spite of having a similar appearance, it sounded nothing like its more traditional contemporaries, such as the Roland JP-8000.

An estimated 500-2,000 standard units were manufactured; an even smaller run of 100-500 rack units were produced, which packaged the Fizmo, including the entire front panel, into a 5-unit rack module.

== Computer-based editing ==
Computer-based editing of the Fizmo was originally possible using a module created for Emagic's SoundDiver program. This software enabled unidirectional (from computer to synthesizer) editing of the Fizmo, and importantly, exposing many parameters not accessible from the front panel, including multi-stage envelopes, and many effects parameters, among others. After SoundDiver ceased to be sold and supported, in 2019, Defective Records Software released Fauxmo, a software application that enabled bi-directional, real-time editing of all of the Fizmo's parameters, as well as other functions that facilitated creation, editing and storage of presets.

== Artists ==
- Eat Static
- The Faint
