= Ensoniq SoundscapeDB =

SoundscapeDB

The SoundscapeDB is an Ensoniq-designed and produced MIDI daughtercard designed to interface with the "Waveblaster" pin header available on many older sound cards. It was released in 1994.

During the early 1990s, Creative Labs created the Waveblaster connector for their Sound Blaster 16 sound cards. This connector would be for their sample-based synthesis upgrade daughtercard, which they also called the Waveblaster. Other sound card manufacturers took advantage of this and put the connector on their cards as well, and many manufacturers also began developing their own upgrade daughtercards.

Ensoniq's daughterboard (DB), the SoundscapeDB, is basically a Soundscape S-2000 with the digital sound reproduction section removed. It was simply the MIDI synthesizer (sample-based synthesizer) of the full Soundscape. The DB contained an Ensoniq OTTOR2 synthesizer chip, a Motorola 68EC000 controller, and a 2 MB patch set ROM. Ensoniq switched to a "revised and improved" 1 MB ROM patch set in a cost-cutting move on a later revision of the board.

== Specifications ==
- 1 MB or 2 MB (depending on revision) compressed patch set ROM
- 32 Simultaneous Voices, 32 Note Polyphony, 16 Channels
- 128 General MIDI Instruments, 61 Drum Programs
- Full Soundscape CD Quality Sound
- SoundscapeDB is compatible with sound boards equipped with 26-pin expansion connector. Including:
  - Creative Labs, Inc. - Sound Blaster 16, Sound Blaster 16 BASIC, Sound Blaster 16 ASP, Sound Blaster 16 SCSI-2, AWE32
  - AZTECH Labs, Inc. - Sound Galaxy NX Pro 16, Sound Galaxy Pro 16 Extra
  - Also compatible with many REVEAL and Packard Bell multimedia products.
