= Ensoniq SDP-1 =

Non-programmable polyphonic digital piano

SDP-1
- Manufacturer: Ensoniq
- Dates: 1986 - <1997. (Note: The journal Transoniq Hacker notes that in 1997 Ensoniq discontinued "support" for "older products," including the SDP-1.)
- Price: $1,395

Technical specifications
- Polyphony: 10
- Synthesis type: Digital Sample-based
- Velocity expression: Yes

Input/output
- Keyboard: 76-key
- External control: MIDI

The Ensoniq SDP-1 is a non-programmable velocity-sensitive weighted-action digital-sample-based keyboard/controller that was available in the late 1980's.

== Features and architecture ==
Two years after Ensoniq debuted the Mirage digital sampler, they introduced the SDP-1 "Sampled Digital Grand". Unlike their flagship product, the SDP-1 samples are in permanent memory and can not be changed. However, where the Mirage could assign at most two different samples to sections of the keyboard, the SDP-1 has multiple samples distributed across the keyboard. It has a 76-key keyboard (longer than the Mirage), with a weighted, velocity-sensitive action. It was advertised as having 12 presets (10 keyboard instruments plus an upright and electric bass), but it would be more accurate to say it has samples for nine instruments: piano, electric (Rhodes) tine piano, marimba, vibraphone, and clavichord, plus the two basses. The piano samples included a standard piano, a "brighter" sounding piano, and a slightly detuned "honky-tonk" piano. The two electric piano patches are basically the same except one includes a chorus effect; likewise for the two clavichord patches. The two marimba patches are "hard" and "soft" (with chorus) mallets. There is one vibraphone sample set.

The upright and electric bass patches, if activated, replace the main samples on the lower end of the keyboard, and two voices were allocated to the bass samples, allowing the remaining eight to be used for the main keyboard sound. The split point is not configurable, but this isn't as inconvenient as it would have been on a shorter keyboard. Generally, the oldest notes would be 'stolen', but the SDP-1 retains the lowest note on the upper sound patch to help preserve a chord's integrity.

The control panel offers limited options aside from patch selection. The right hand samples can be shifted down an octave to compensate for having the left hand keys reassigned to the bass samples. The MIDI channel that the SDP-1 uses for output can be selected. There is a volume control slider, a transposition slider, and a "stereo" button to switch from monophonic to stereophonic output. The back panel includes 1/4" output jacks for Left/Mono, Right, a stereo headphone jack, and a separate output for the bass. There's also a jack for the pedals, a small tuning knob (labeled "A440"), and the usual MIDI In/Out/Thru.

The SDP-1 came with a two-pedal pedalboard that could be placed on the floor beneath the keyboard. Along with the common sustain pedal, the SDP-1 offered a sostenuto pedal, which sustained the notes being held at the time the pedal was depressed, retaining them in their original timbre even if a patch change was made afterwards, which one reviewer described as a "very exciting performance technique." A sostenuto pedal was very unusual, especially for keyboards in the SDP-1's price range.
