= Ensoniq =

American music technology company

Ensoniq Corp.
- Type: Subsidiary
- Industry: Musical instruments and technology
- Founded: 1982; 44 years ago
- Founder: Bruce Crockett; Albert Charpentier; Bob Yannes
- Defunct: 2002
- Fate: Acquired by Creative Technology (January 1998) and merged with E-MU Systems, now dissolved
- Headquarters: Malvern, Pennsylvania
- Parent: Creative Technology
- Website: www.ensoniq.com at the Wayback Machine (archived July 19, 1997)

Ensoniq Corp. was an American electronics manufacturer, best known throughout the mid-1980s and 1990s for its musical instruments, principally samplers and synthesizers.

== History ==
In spring 1983, former MOS Technology engineers Robert "Bob" Yannes, Bruce Crockett, Charles Winterble, David Ziembicki, and Albert Charpentier formed Peripheral Visions. The team had designed the Commodore 64 but had left MOS/Commodore as a result of disagreements with company CEO Jack Tramiel, over a new design of home computer for Commodore which they proposed, but Tramiel rejected. To raise funds in order to build the machine themselves under their new venture, Peripheral Visions agreed to build a computer keyboard for the Atari 2600, but the video game crash of 1983 canceled the project and Commodore sued the new company, claiming that it owned the keyboard project. Their expertise at Commodore however had also led to the design of a new sound chip - the Digital Oscillator Chip (DOC) which had reached a more advanced state of development as the doomed keyboard project for Atari.

Renaming itself as Ensoniq, the new company instead designed a music synthesizer based on the DOC chip.. This product emerged as the Mirage sampling keyboard in late 1984. Samplers had purely been the preserve of professional studios and established pop stars, but at the bargain price of $1695 the Mirage brought the technology within the reach of the amateur musician, and was a runaway success - selling 8,000 units in its first year of production.

Ensoniq grew rapidly over the next few years with the success of the Mirage and the ESQ-1. The plant in Great Valley, Pennsylvania employed nearly 200 people and housed the manufacturing facility. A number of successful products followed which all included the full-custom ICs for music and effects which were developed in house. While the core keyboard products were generally successful, there were some quality problems and fierce competition from the Japanese "big three" (Roland, Korg and Yamaha) who were able to undercut on price, offer better reliability and match technical specification, eventually drove Ensoniq out of the musical instrument business - a similar fate that had befallen earlier American electronic music pioneers in the 1980s - such as Moog, Oberheim, Sequential and Linn Electronics.

An attempt to diversify into hearing aids was unsuccessful and put the company in financial peril. In the mid-nineties, they developed a line of very cost-effective sound cards which sold millions of units.

In January 1998, ENSONIQ Corp. was acquired by Creative Technology Ltd. for $77 million. The acquisition was focused on the sound-card technology of the Ensoniq Audio-PCI. The musical products division, which was in financial trouble, was merged with E-mu Systems to form the E-Mu/Ensoniq division of Creative. Over the next three years the Ensoniq operation in Pennsylvania was gradually dismantled and shut down (the factory building is now occupied by Janssen Biotech). After releasing an entry-level E-mu MK6/PK6 and Ensoniq Halo keyboards in 2002 – essentially keyboard versions of the Proteus 2500 module – the E-Mu/Ensoniq division was dissolved and support for legacy products was discontinued soon afterward.

== Musical instruments and digital systems ==
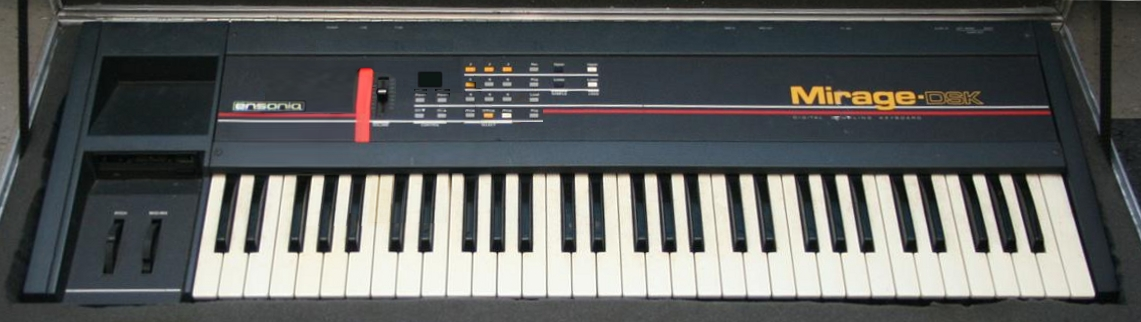
Mirage DSK-1 (c. 1985)

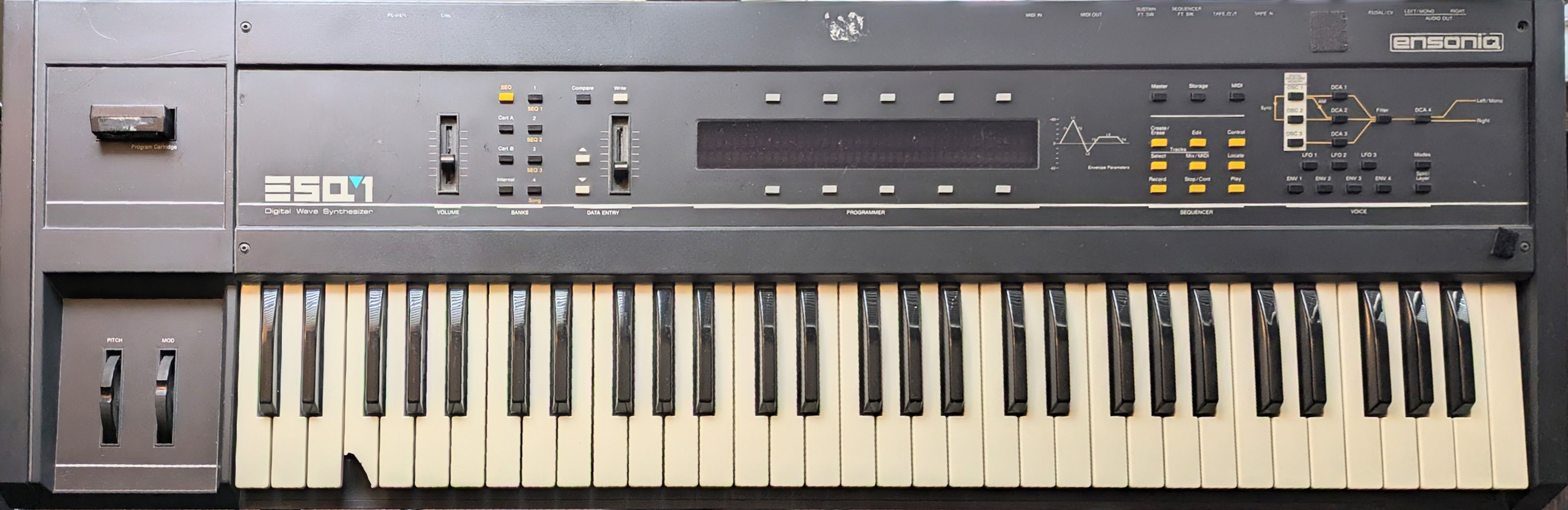
Ensoniq ESQ-1 (1987)

Ensoniq entered the instrument market with the Mirage sampling keyboard in 1985. At the price of USD$1695 it cost significantly less than previous samplers such as the Fairlight CMI and the E-MU Emulator. Starting with the ESQ-1 (1986), they began producing sample-based synthesizers. Following the success of these products, Ensoniq established a subsidiary in Japan in 1987. The EPS performance sampler - the successor to the Mirage - based on the next generation DOC II chip - debuted in early 1988.

Ensoniq products were highly professional. Strong selling points were ease-of-use and their characteristic "fat", rich sound (generally thought of as being an "American" quality, as opposed to the "Japanese" sound which was more "digital" and somewhat "cold"). After the Mirage, all Ensoniq instruments featured integrated sequencers (even their late '80s and early '90s samplers) providing an all-in-one "digital studio production concept" instrument. These were often called "Music Workstations". Starting with the VFX synthesizer, high-quality effects units were included, in addition most synthesizer and all sampler models featured disk drives and/or RAM cards for storage. The manuals and tutorial documents were clearly written and highly musician-oriented, allowing the users to quickly get satisfactory results from their machines. In 1988, the company enlisted the Dixie Dregs in a limited edition promotional CD Off the Record which featured the band using the EPS sampler and SQ-80 cross wave synthesizer.

The company had much success with the SQ product line starting in the early 1990s. This was a lower-cost line that included the SQ-1 (61 keys), SQ-2 (76 keys) and SQ-R (rack-mounted, with no keys or sequencer), as well as KS-32 with full 76-keys weighted piano-keyboard. Later versions were produced with 32 sound-generating voices.

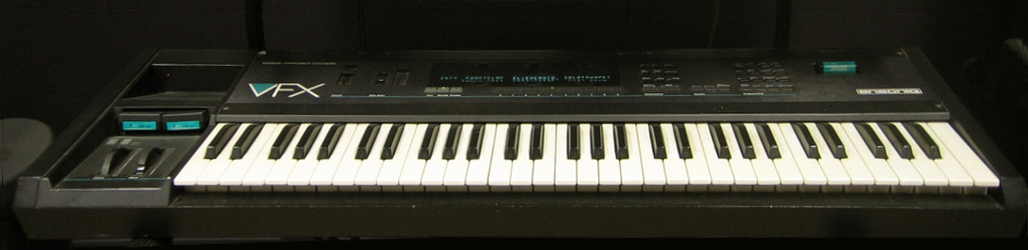
VFX (1989)

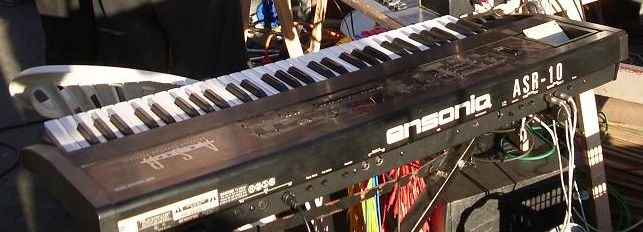
ASR-10 (1992)

The company's heyday was in the early 1990s when the VFX synthesizers offered innovative performance and sequencing features (and terrific acoustic sounds), along with the ASR series of 16-bit samplers which also integrated synthesis, effects, and sequencer into a single-unit digital studio. The TS synthesizers followed the legacy of the VFX line, improving several aspects such as the polyphony, effects engine, sample-loading capabilities and even better synth and acoustic sounds. The DP series of effects rack-mount units offered parallel processing and reverb presets on a par with Lexicon's offerings, but at affordable prices.

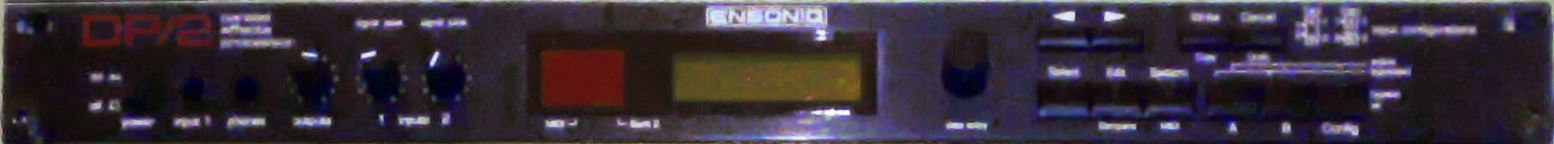
DP/2 (1995)

Despite these strengths, early (1980s) Ensoniq instruments suffered from reliability and quality problems such as bad keyboards (Mirage DSK-8), under-developed power-supply units (early ESQ-1), or mechanical issues (EPS polypressure keyboard). Through the early and mid-1990s, much effort was focused on improving the reliability of the products. The company did not manage to reinvent its workstation concept in order to financially survive the mid and late '90s.

=== Timeline of major products ===
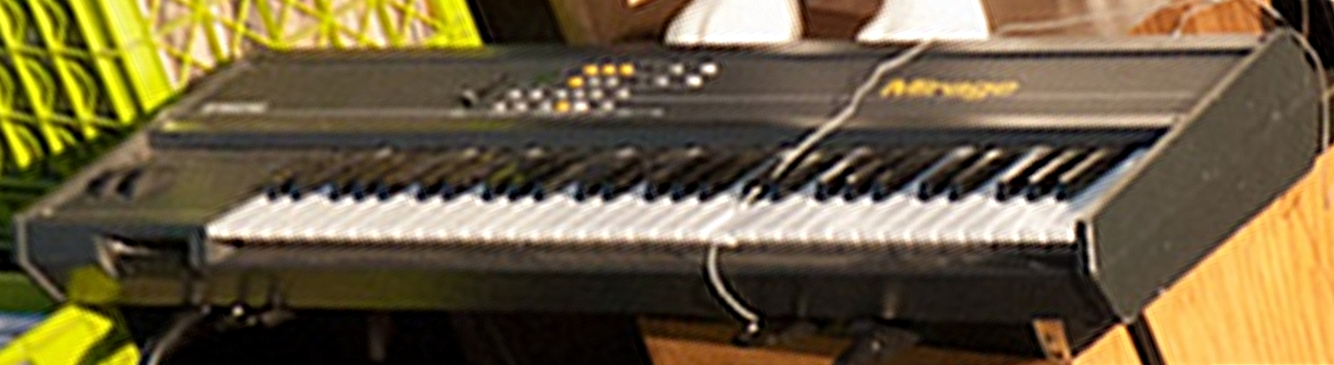
Mirage DSK-8 (1985)

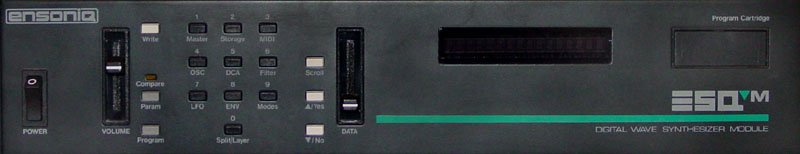
ESQ-M (1986)

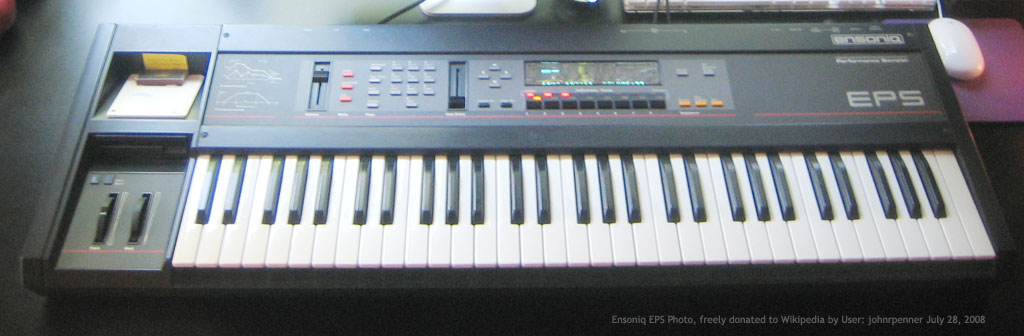
EPS (1988)

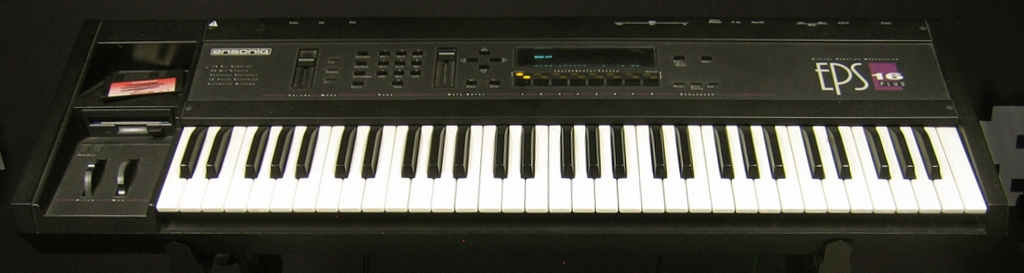
EPS-16+ (1991)

- 1984 – Ensoniq Pro-Cussion
- 1984 – Ensoniq Mirage
- 1986 – Ensoniq ESQ-1
- 1986 – Ensoniq SDP-1 Sampled Digital Piano
- 1988 – Ensoniq SQ-80
- 1988 – Ensoniq EPS
- 1989 – Ensoniq EPS-M
- 1989 – Ensoniq VFX
- 1989 – Ensoniq VFX-SD
- 1990 – Ensoniq SQ-1
- 1990 – Ensoniq SQ-R
- 1990 – Ensoniq EPS 16 Plus
- 1990 – Ensoniq SD-1
- 1991 – Ensoniq SQ-R+
- 1991 – Ensoniq SQ-1+
- 1991 – Ensoniq SQ-2
- 1992 – Ensoniq SQ-1+ 32 voice
- 1992 – Ensoniq SQ-2 32 voice
- 1992 – Ensoniq SQ-R+ 32-voice
- 1992 – Ensoniq KS-32

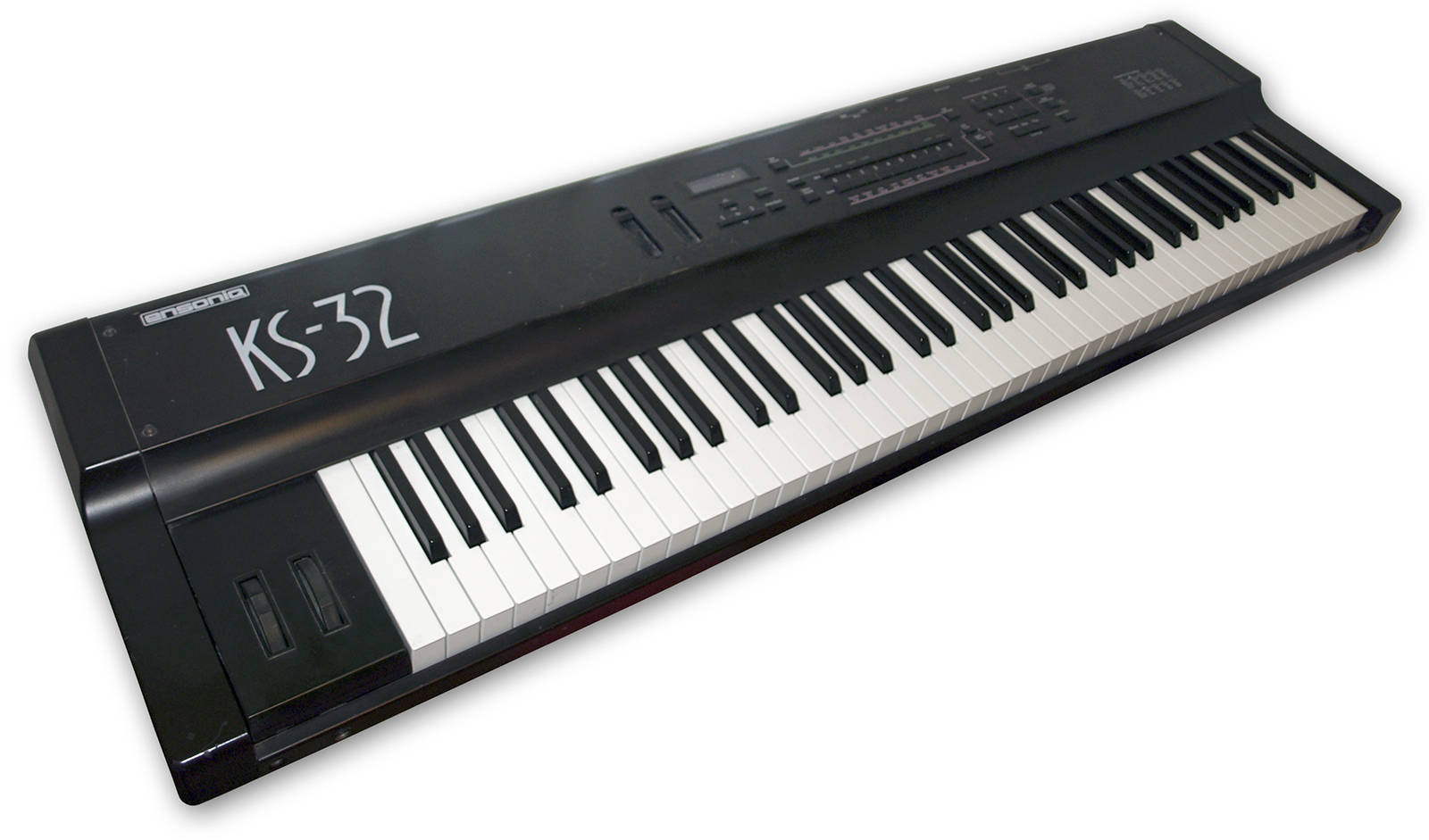
KS-32 (1992)

- 1992 – Ensoniq ASR-10
- 1992 – Ensoniq TS-10 and TS-12
- 1993 – Ensoniq DP/4
- 1994 – Ensoniq KT-76 and Ensoniq KT-88
- 1995 – Ensoniq DP/2
- 1995 – Ensoniq DP/4+
- 1996 – Ensoniq MR61 and MR76
- 1997 – Ensoniq ASR X
- 1997 – Ensoniq DP/Pro
- 1997 – Ensoniq E Prime

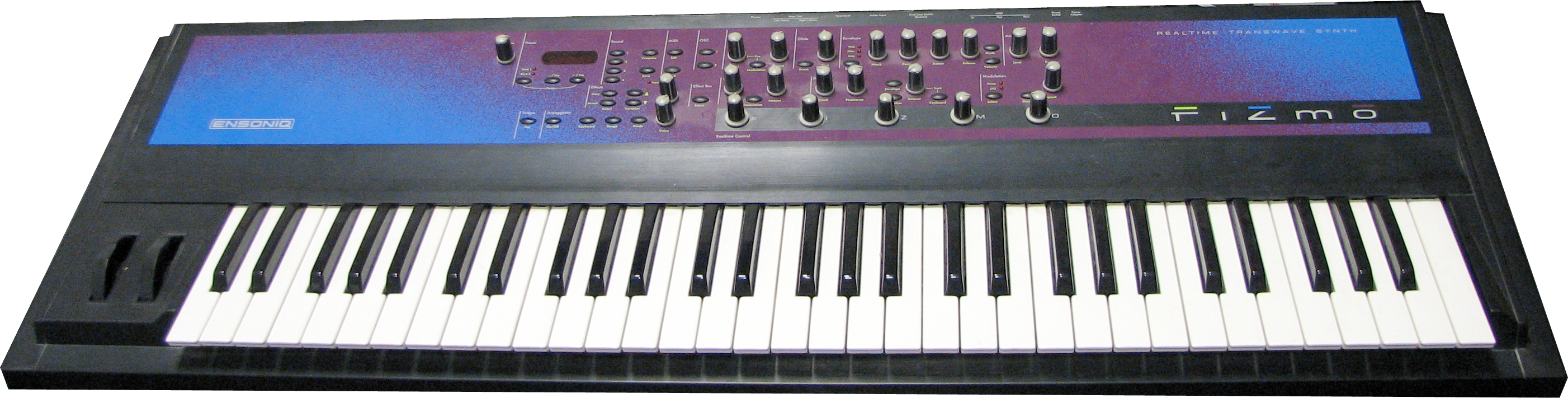
Fizmo (1998)

- 1998 – Ensoniq Fizmo
- 1998 – Ensoniq ZR-76
- 1998 – Ensoniq ASR X Pro
- 1998 – Ensoniq PARIS Digital Audio Workstation
- 2002 – Ensoniq Halo (E-mu product using Ensoniq brand)

== Sound cards and semiconductors ==
In 1986, after making an agreement with Apple Computer, the same ES5503 DOC (Digital Oscillator Chip, marketed as "Q-Chip") used in the Mirage sampler (DSK-8, DSK-1, DMS-1), ESQ-1, ESQ-M and SQ-80 synthesizers, and SDP-1 piano module, was incorporated into the Apple IIGS personal computer.

Later engines, with 16-bit sample playback and internal digital filters, were ES5504 DOC-II (used in the EPS sampler) and ES5505 OTIS (used in the EPS16+ sampler and the VFX line of synthesizers featuring 21 voices and 32 voices SD-1. Finally, ES5506 OTTO drove all subsequent 32-voice machines (TS10/12, ASR-10/88) and the dual-OTTO machines (KT, MR, ZR). The latest incarnation, ES5548 OTTO-48, was used in the final line of Ensoniq studio products (ASR-X, FIZMO).

Ensoniq also developed an effects DSP, ES5510 ESP, that was used in the machines from VFX on and the standalone FX units DP/2 and DP/4. OTTO-48 generation uses its greatly enhanced successor, ES5511 ESP V2. A combination of OTTO and ESP, ES5540 OTTOFX, was also developed and sold.

The Ensoniq ES5505 OTIS/OTISR2, and ES5510 ESP (Ensoniq Signal Processor) were also used in various arcade games. They were all manufactured on the CMOS process. OTTO was licensed to Advanced Gravis for use in the Gravis Ultrasound card. In 1994, production began on PC sound cards for home computers. The design of the video-game console Atari Panther also included the OTIS chip, though the product never reached series production. A dedicated version of OTTO, ES5530/35 OPUS, was developed for AT-bus sound cards, featuring built-in joystick and CD-ROM interface.

Ensoniq's sound cards were popular and shipped with many IBM PC compatibles. Many games in the late MS-DOS era supported the Ensoniq Soundscape either directly or through General MIDI. In addition, Ensoniq devised an ISA software audio emulation solution for their new PCI sound cards that was compatible with most contemporary IBM PC games. It is speculated that this was an important factor in Creative Lab's acquisition of Ensoniq, because Creative/E-MU was struggling with legacy compatibility at the time with their higher-performance PCI audio solutions.

=== Soundscape ===
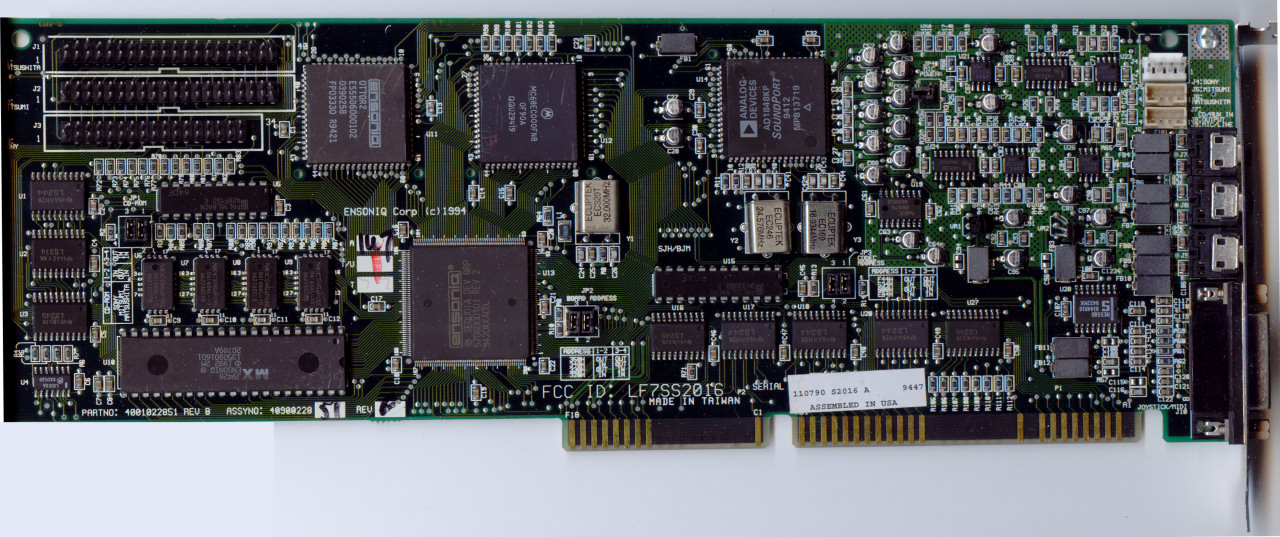
Soundscape S-2000

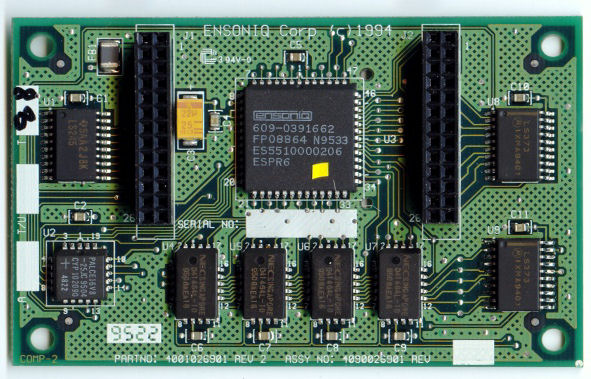
ESP DB

- Ensoniq Soundscape S-2000 The original Soundscape was Ensoniq's first direct foray into the PC sound card market. It was a full-length ISA digital audio and 'wavetable' sample-based synthesis audio card, equipped with a 2 MB Ensoniq-built ROM-based patch set.
- Ensoniq SoundscapeDB The SSDB was a 'wavetable' daughterboard (sample-based synthesis daughterboard) upgrade for PCs with a sound card bearing a Wave Blaster-compatible connector. It was based upon the S-2000 chipset but was without the digital sound effects section or any DAC. The SSDB would use the host sound card for final output.

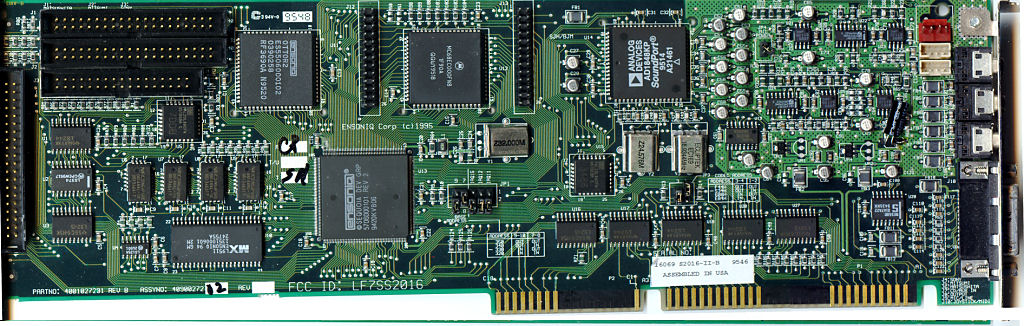
Soundscape Elite

- Ensoniq Soundscape Elite was Ensoniq's high-end ISA offering. It offered the highest MIDI quality of any PC sound card they ever made, including the newer AudioPCI. The Elite was based mostly around the S-2000, with some additional features that set it far apart from its progenitor.

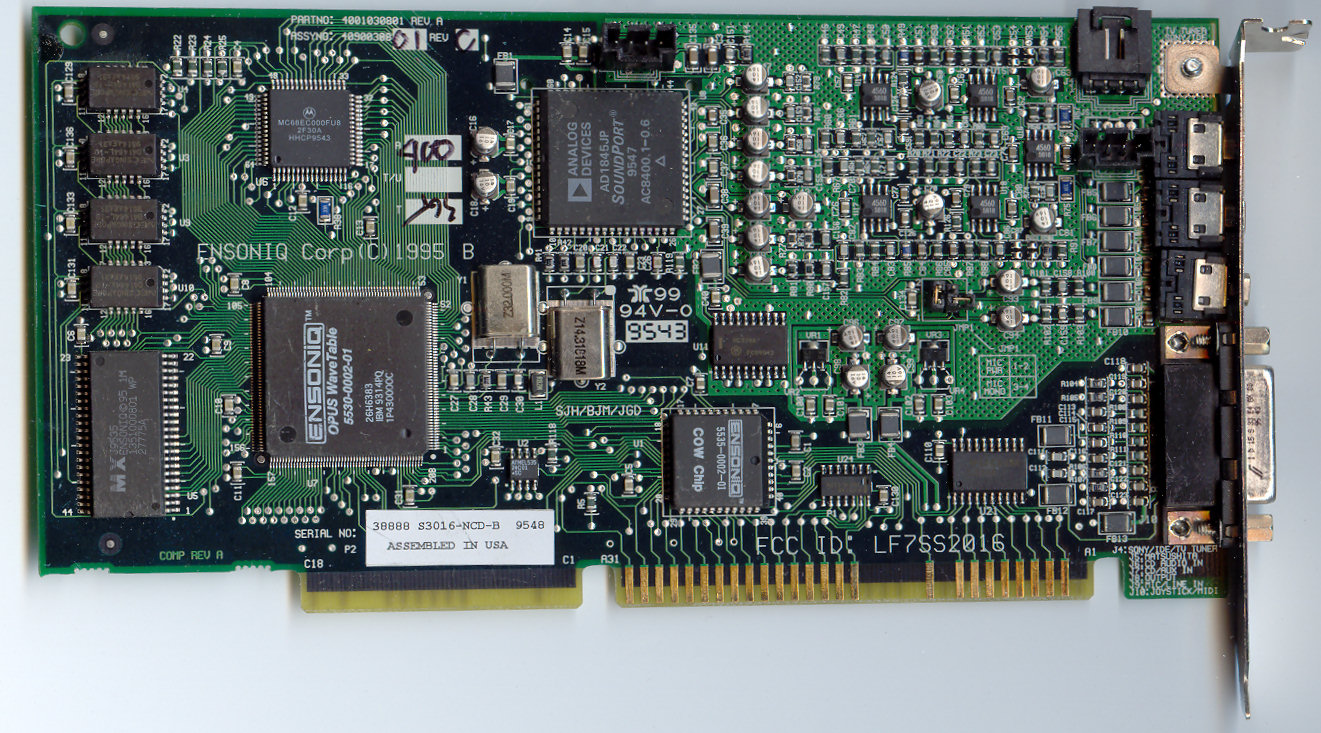
Soundscape OPUS

- Ensoniq Soundscape OPUS This card was a Gateway 2000 OEM, and possibly was used by other OEMs, but was never sold to Ensoniq's customers directly. It was a Soundscape-like board, using the Ensoniq 5530/5535 OPUS multimedia sound chip, a chip that was only used on these OEM boards and essentially comprises an OTTO with back-then usual additional interfacing (Joystick, CD-ROM).
- Ensoniq Soundscape VIVO90 was Ensoniq's generational step forward from the Ensoniq Soundscape S-2000-based boards. It was first produced in 1996. VIVO90 had similar specifications to the older boards, but was built to cost less to manufacture.

=== AudioPCI ===
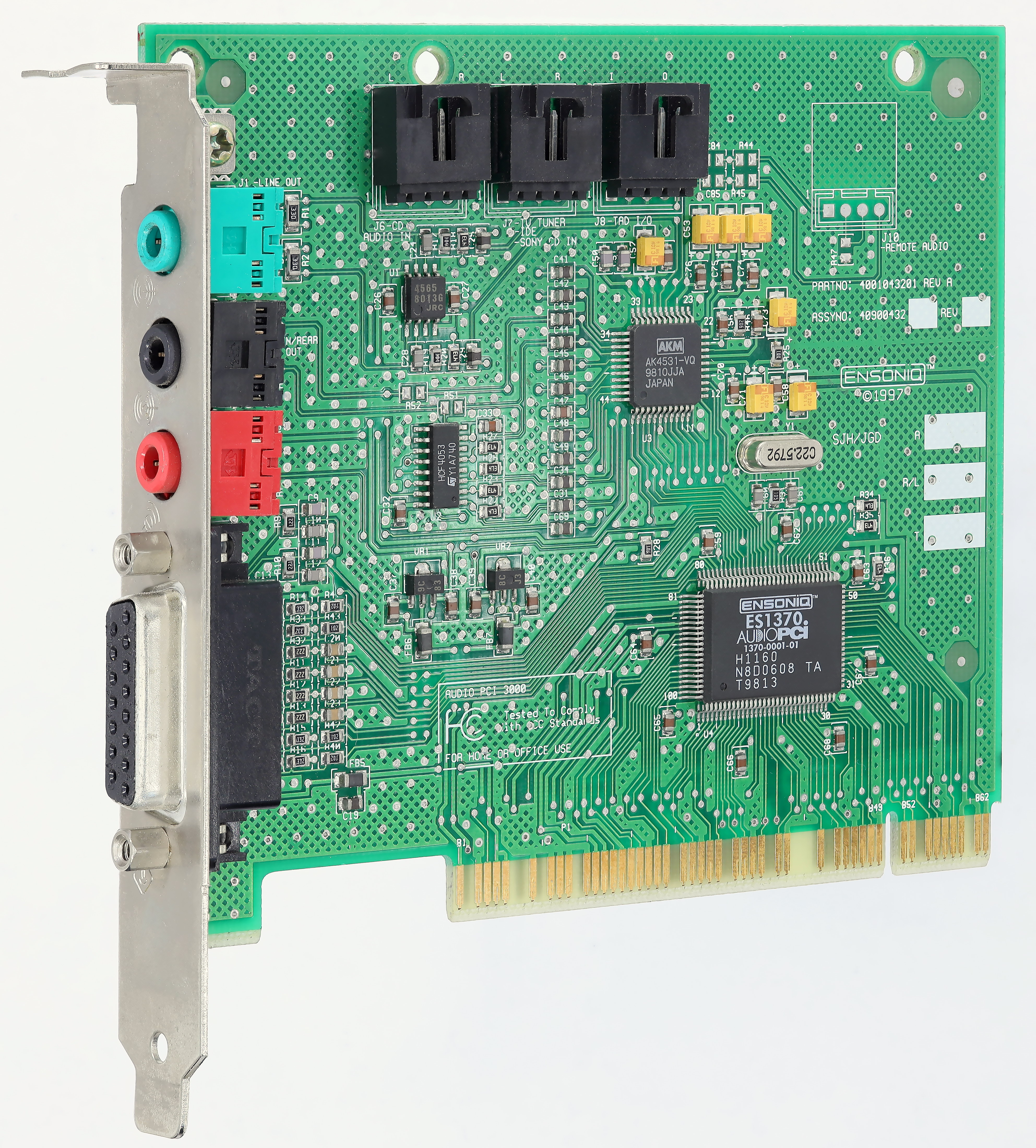
AudioPCI

- Ensoniq AudioPCI The AudioPCI was designed to be a low-cost, yet feature-rich audio solution, which could be integrated on computer motherboards as a value-added option. It consisted of little more than a small, host CPU driven audio chip (one of the following: S5016, ES1370, ES1371) and a companion DAC. Despite its small size and low cost, AudioPCI still offers nearly all of the audio capabilities and functionality of the Soundscape ELITE card. The AudioPCI line used an NMI-based emulation terminate-and-stay-resident (TSR) program Ensoniq developed to provide a reasonable level of legacy DOS compatibility without requiring any signals from the ISA bus, though the TSR could cause problems with games that relied on custom flavors of protected mode.
