= Ensoniq Soundscape OPUS =

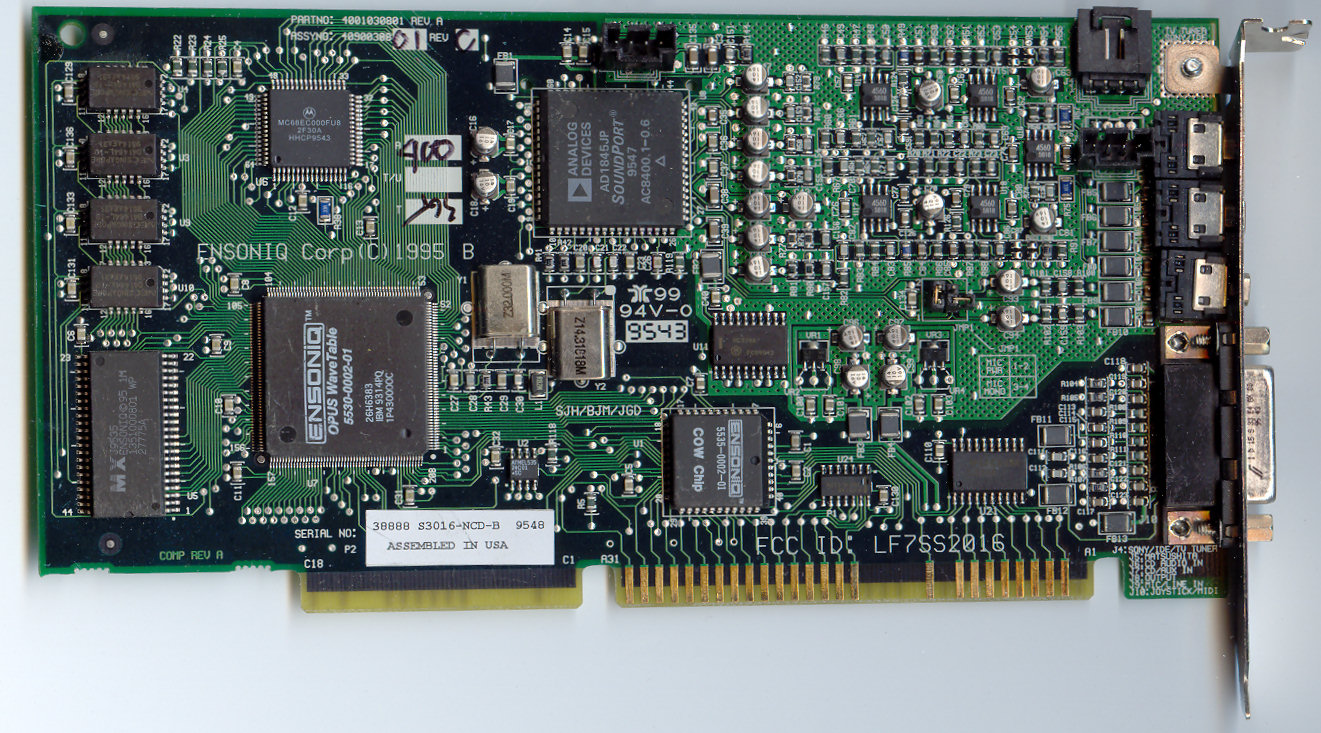
Ensoniq Soundscape OPUS

The Ensoniq Soundscape OPUS (SS-3016-NCD) is a Gateway 2000 OEM sound card, and possibly was used by other OEMs, but was never sold to Ensoniq's customers directly. It was a Soundscape-like board, using the Ensoniq "OPUS" multimedia sound chip that only was used on these OEM boards. It had a 1MB patch set ROM chip, resulting in a lesser MIDI quality compared to the Soundscape and Soundscape ELITE. The "OPUS" cards again carry the Motorola 68EC000 CPU. The variety of CD-ROM interfaces have been removed. Otherwise, however, the card is simply a cost-reduced Soundscape-compatible board with similar capabilities.

While Ensoniq always stated on their site that they did not support the card, the regular Soundscape's driver package functions on it. Ensoniq's support page referred to the boards as Soundscape OPUS. In a bit of humor, the board holds a chip labeled "COW". No doubt this is related to the card being a Gateway OEM board, a company known for their cow-related image.

== ENSONIQ ES-5530 "OPUS" Multimedia Sound Chip ==
The Ensoniq ES-5530 OPUS chip was used on Ensoniq's OEM Soundscape PC audio card. It was primarily found in Gateway 2000 computers as an Ensoniq OEM sound board. Sound cards based on this chip were never available at retail. Soundscapes based upon this chip had similar capabilities to their retail Soundscape counterparts, which were themselves based upon the Ensoniq 'wavetable' sample-based synthesis chip pair 'Otto' and 'Sequoia'.

The chip was a low-cost, highly integrated 'wavetable' sample-based synthesis solution designed for the burgeoning multimedia PC market. It supported Microsoft MPC Level I & II standards and was Sound Blaster compatible. It was manufactured on a 0.8 micrometer double-metal VLSI CMOS process.

The major features of OPUS were:

- 'wavetable' sample-based synthesis with 32 independent voices
- Oversampled 18-bit d/a converter
- Integrated AT bus interface including:
  - Built in flexible CD-ROM interface
  - Built in joystick interface
  - Real time digital filters
  - 5 channel stereo serial communication port - 3 inputs 2 outputs
  - Industry standard data formats
  - Programmable clocks for defining serial protocol
