= Ensoniq MR61 =

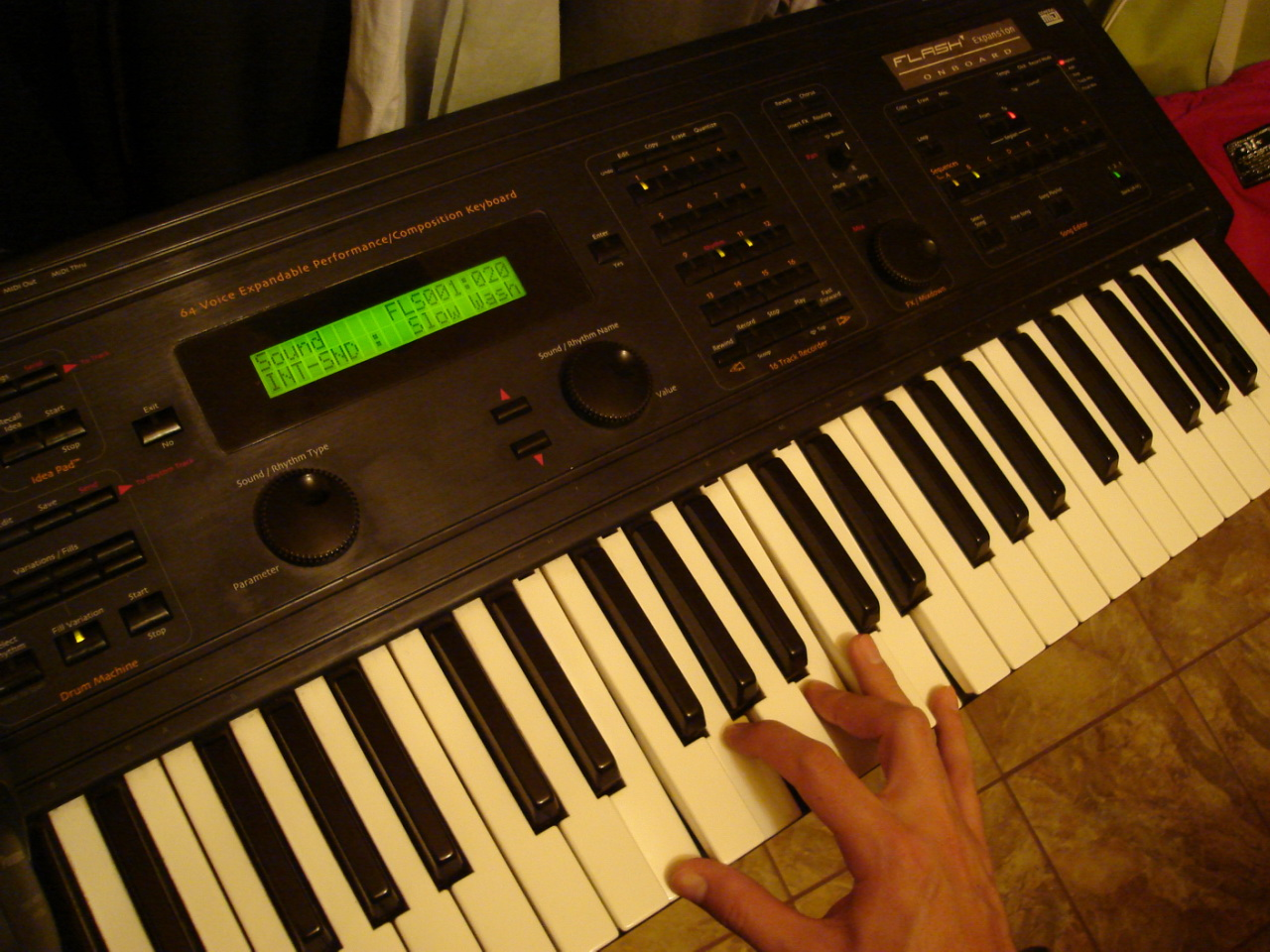
Ensoniq MR-61/76

The Ensoniq MR61 & MR76 are a 61-key & 76 key music workstation synthesizer that Ensoniq released in 1996. It features a 16-track sequencer, digital effects, and several hundred onboard sounds or patches.

This music workstation got rid of some previous classical Ensoniq features, such as polyphonic after-touch (replacing it with a mono version) and full sound editability. Its concept of usage was also radically different from previous Ensoniq keyboards, such as the TS-10. The machine's operating system was created with numerous operational and MIDI software bugs. An updated OS chip that resolved these issues was created and is still available from third-party vendors. Most problems were compensated for by an improved 64-note polyphony, high quality 24-bit effects and a quick (but not fully editable) sequencer. The addition of the Idea Pad, which was essentially a MIDI capture buffer, allowed the user to quickly move anything recently played on the MIDI keyboard, including pitch-bend, mod, and MIDI real-time controllers to a track in the sequencer.

While the direct sample loading facilities of the previous TS/ASR models were lost, a rare add-on card, called the MR-Flash, allowed the MR/ZR keyboards to load up to 4 mebibytes of samples into permanent flash ROM, via floppy disk drive. However, no sample library import facilities were offered, so existing ASR/TS owners couldn't use their sample files on the new machine. A drum machine with pro-quality mixable preset patterns, benefited from the unusually large internal drum sounds library (approx. 700 samples) and was integrated with the sequencer, but it was impossible to create patterns inside the machine. Instead, a program that allowed a user to create drum patterns on PC was developed, thus allowing the user to create numerous rhythms that could be loaded onto disk and work within the fluid drum machine and all aspects of the keyboard.

The effects section runs at full 44.1 kHz quality, unlike the TS engine at 32 kHz. The routing scheme was also simplified from previous machines and sports similarities with Roland's XP machines.

All MR versions could house up to three expansion cards, each one holding up to 24 megabytes of samples and sound data. That was a first for Ensoniq products. Three are known: Perfect Piano, Urban Dance Project and World Sounds. Each cost about $250. A fourth card, the Drums Expansion, could give the rack version a feature that was a standard part of the keyboard versions. It was a 2 mebibyte add-on and contained about 700 drum sounds. A fifth card was the aforementioned flash expansion.

The MR76 was the 76-note weighted keyboard version. The MR-Rack (which actually appeared before the keyboard versions) shared the same architecture and sounds, with the obvious exception of the sequencer and drum machine. Also, while the rack version could take the same wave expansion cards of the keyboard counterparts, it was not compatible with the flash ROM sample-loading add-on.

You can hear some Ensoniq MR-Sounds on the Janet Jackson Song Together Again and her album The Velvet Rope from 1997.
