= Ensoniq TS-10 =

Music workstation

The Ensoniq TS-10 was a synthesizer and music workstation introduced by Ensoniq in 1993. It provided synthesis, user sample playback, sequencer, effect units and performance facilities in a 61-key package.

Another version, the TS-12, had the same features plus 76 weighted keys and channel aftertouch courtesy of a Fatar keybed, whereas the TS-10 had polyphonic aftertouch and 61 unweighted keys.

== Main features ==
The TS series had 32-note polyphony, integrated 24-bit effects engine (with 48 bit accumulation), a 30,000 note sequencer (expandable to over 100,000 via RAM chips) which featured up to 24 tracks, full MIDI capabilities. The design was a direct evolution of Ensoniq's previous VFX and SD synthesizers. While the synthesis structure lacked a resonant filter, which limited the sample+synthesis possibilities, the TS could read ASR wavesamples directly. This feature allowed musicians to play sounds from a vast library of sample disks and CD-ROMs (via SCSI expansion option).

The front panel offered plenty of buttons for dedicated functions, and a large 40 x 2 vacuum fluorescent display, easier to read onstage than conventional LCDs.

=== Synthesis structure ===
The TS offered up to 6 oscillators per patch or sound. Each oscillator was processed by its own pitch, filter and amplifier blocks, with dedicated LFOs and envelope generators for each block. The architecture allowed various modulation sources, such as keyboard velocity, modulation and pitch wheels, etc. to modify several instances of the sonic chain. Despite the well-specified architecture, the filter didn't feature any kind of resonance. This limited the possibilities of emulating analog and heavily-filtered sounds. However, this was a common omission from several manufacturers of the early 1990s. The total 32-note polyphony was reduced when using more than one oscillator per patch. The user patches could be stored in one of 120 memories, or saved to floppy disk.

=== Hyperwave ===
It offered a kind of basic per-oscillator wavesequencing, essentially being a programmable list of sampled waveforms, taken from the internal ROM or sample RAM area, and played in sequence with definable playback step times, pitch and other parameters. Clever use of this facility could produce complete textural or rhythmic patterns, with up to 6 wavesequences playing at once, per patch. One big limitation was the wavesequencing timing, which was fixed at patch level and not tempo-dependent.

=== Effects ===
An integral component of Ensoniq synths, the TS' effects were first-class and well specified, at 24-bit and 32 kHz engine. The effects block was arranged in several fixed algorithms, which allowed up to three simultaneous effects at once, plus a dry signal path. The effects list was comprehensive, including reverbs, flangers, chorus, compressors, delays. While adequate at single patch level, the effects block had to be shared by all instruments when the sequencer was used.

=== Sequencer ===
Ensoniq's approach for sequencing was somewhat different from other manufacturers. Instead of offering a linear set of tracks for recording, the TS required the user to record short sequences (12 tracks each) to use as a base for song structure, then chaining them and optionally layering another 12 linear tracks on top of the chained blocks. The sequencer editing options included quantization with audition, controller editing and scaling and MIDI functions per track, as well as copying whole or parts of tracks to anywhere else. The keyboard could store up to 30 songs with 100 sequences per song, memory-permitting, and everything was kept in memory when the synth was turned off. Modern synthesizers, with larger and better sequencers, demand the user to save their work before power down, since the sequencer memory is not backed up.

=== Sample playback ===
In addition to the machine's internal 6 MB ROM sampled waveforms, the user could install up to 8 MB (divided into two banks of 4 MB) sample RAM (volatile), via 30-pin SIMMs. The samples could be loaded from the floppy disk drive, or via a SCSI hard drive or CD-ROM attached to the machine, containing an ASR-format disk. The synth even remembered the mapping of samples and sounds used, and requested the appropriate disks for loading in power-up. The TS couldn't import WAV or AIFF format samples as the disk format used was Ensoniq's own, first developed for the EPS sampler, and it wasn't MS-DOS compatible, so the user was limited to loading samples available in the extensive EPS/ASR library.

=== Performance features ===
The TS offered the ubiquitous pair of modulation and pitch wheels, polyphonic aftertouch, and 'patch select' buttons for easily changing tonal variants of a patch. It was very easy to layer up to three single sounds, or split the keyboard in all zones for internal or MIDI playing control, without cumbersome menu editing. It was also possible to layer up to six single sounds by taking advantage of the live-auditioning feature of the sequencer (without actually recording or playing back anything), but this was less easy to manage in a performance environment.

== In use ==
The TS suffered from limitations including the non-resonant digital filter, or the proprietary format used for floppies, which was incompatible with anything else. This prevented Standard MIDI Files to be read by the machine, and the strange track arrangement of the sequencer limited the MIDI multitimbral parts of the TS to 12 instead of the standard 16.

The vacuum fluorescent display, although unique and very easy to read, was prone to malfunction after much time of use and very hard to replace or repair. Even Ensoniq acknowledged this problem by creating a variant called the TS-10 Plus, which used a conventional LCD instead of the vacuum one. This model also had the SCSI expansion installed and the full sample memory expansion also installed.

The TS series were well received by musicians and producers, mainly because of the rich, professional sound they offered, the enormous ASR sample library that it could load, and the live performance features that offered.
