= Ensoniq SQ-80 =

Digital/analog synthesizer

SQ-80
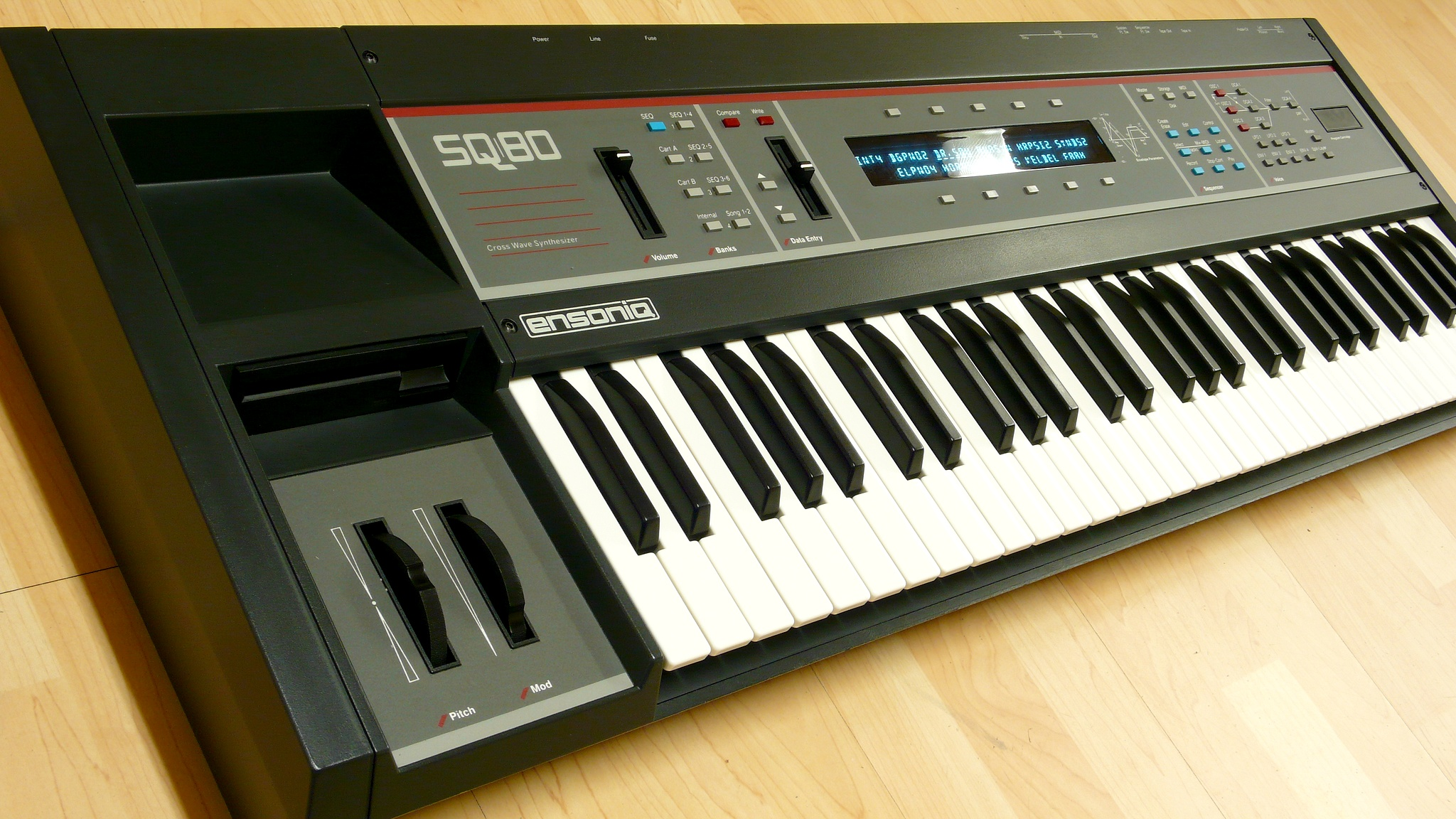
- Ensoniq SQ-80, featuring the 8tr multi-timbral pattern sequencer with a FD drive
- Manufacturer: Ensoniq
- Dates: 1987 - 1989

Technical specifications
- Polyphony: 8 voices
- Timbrality: 8
- Oscillator: 3× single-cycle wavetable-lookup oscillators per voice, 43 additional waveforms (including 5 drum-kit)
- LFO: 3 per voice
- Synthesis type: Cross Wave Synthesis (hybrid: digital wavetable-lookup oscillator / analog filter)
- Filter: 1 analog filter per voice
- Attenuator: 4 Envelope - Four levels, four rates
- Aftertouch expression: Yes (polyphonic)
- Velocity expression: Yes
- Effects: None

Input/output
- Keyboard: 61 keys, split or layered
- Left-hand control: Pitch bend, mod wheel
- External control: MIDI

The Ensoniq SQ-80 is a digital/analog synthesizer manufactured from 1987 to 1989. It was Ensoniq's update to its first synth, the Ensoniq ESQ-1.

Compared to the ESQ-1, the SQ-80 includes 43 additional waveforms (including five drumkits), an enhanced sequencer, and a floppy disk drive for storing patches and sequences. Synthesis-wise, the SQ-80 introduced the so-called 2nd Release, a low-cost solution to simulate reverb-like effects. In contrast to the ESQ-1, the SQ-80 not only offers MIDI in and out, but also MIDI thru jacks.

The SQ-80 was the first Ensoniq product to feature their patented Polypressure Keyboard technology. Unlike the ESQ-1 and Mirage, the SQ-80's keyboard offers channel pressure and polyphonic pressure (aftertouch) as well as programmable hardness (velocity). Since the keyboard does not use mechanical sensors for detecting velocity and pressure, it is immune to contact problems (which ESQ-1 and Mirage suffered from) and pressure sensor wear-out (like conventional keyboards).

Because of the hardware similarities, the SQ-80's operating system was later back-ported to the ESQ-1 to become the latest ESQ-1 OS Version 3.5, which is almost identical to SQ-80 OS 1.8 apart from the hardware-specific features (additional waveforms, floppy routines, and keyboard control).

This machine also features the same interface as its predecessor (ESQ-1) at a time when other synthesizers were getting harder and harder to program due to their frustrating obscure menu navigation systems. On the SQ-80 and ESQ-1, a large fluorescent display consisting of two rows of 40 alpha-numeric characters shows many parameters at once for a given section, and buttons placed over and under it give instant access to each one.

== Notable users ==
- Adamski – 1989–1991 recording sessions ("Killer" single) all tracks on Liveandirect (album)
- Louis Panzer - Nocturnus
- Mr. Bungle - Mr. Bungle (1991)
- Roger Lynch Troutman Jr. - "Roger Troutman II" (1970-2003) - Roger Troutman II: The Second Coming 2000 album
