= Ensoniq Mirage =

Polyphonic synthesizer

Mirage
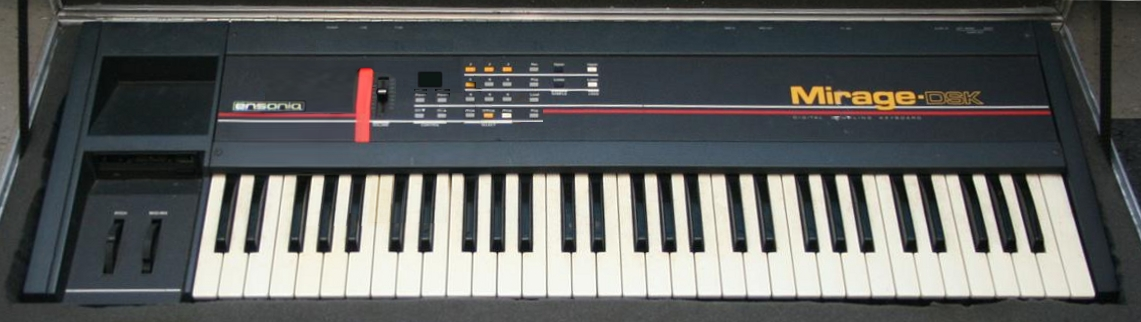
- Ensoniq Mirage DSK-1, the third generation
- Manufacturer: Ensoniq
- Dates: 1984–1988
- Price: $1,695 (introductory, DSK-8)

Technical specifications
- Polyphony: 8
- Timbrality: 8
- Oscillator: 16 accessible (32 with alternate OS platform), digital PCM sampler, 8-bit
- Synthesis type: Digital/Analog Sample-based Subtractive
- Filter: Analog resonant Curtis CEM3328 4-pole 24-dB/octave low-pass VCF per voice
- Velocity expression: Yes
- Storage memory: 128 KB samples + 16 KB system

Input/output
- Keyboard: 61-key
- External control: MIDI

The Ensoniq Mirage is one of the earliest affordable sampler-synths, introduced in 1984 as Ensoniq's first product. Introduced at a list price of $1,695 (equivalent to $5,253 in 2025) with features previously only found on more expensive samplers like the Fairlight CMI, the Mirage sold nearly 8,000 units in its first year - more than the combined unit sales of all other samplers at that time. The Mirage sold over 30,000 units during its availability.

== History ==
The Mirage is the brainchild of Robert Yannes, the man responsible for the MOS Technology SID (Sound Interface Device) chip in the Commodore 64 and Albert Charpentier chip designer of several VIC20, 64 PET chips. The Ensoniq Digital Oscillator Chip (Ensoniq ES5503 DOC – referred to the "Q-chip" in Ensoniq advertisements) that he designed was used in the Mirage, ESQ-1, SDP-1, and SQ-80 and the Apple IIGS personal computer.

The VLSI ES5503 allowed the Mirage to offer digital audio sampling technology at a dramatically lower price compared to existing competitors. In 1984, when the MSRP $1,695 Mirage debuted, the only other polyphonic digital audio samplers available were the E-mu Emulator II (MSRP $8,000 to $10,000) and the large Fairlight CMI Series II system (approximately $28,000 for a basic system). (The New England Digital Synclavier II system did not offer a polyphonic sampling option until later, in 1985.) The sampling resolution of the Mirage, Emulator II, and Fairlight CMI Series II was 8-bit.

The Mirage was one of the first consumer products to utilize the then-new Microfloppy 3.5-inch floppy diskette format, and thereby early Mirage keyboards included the first Microfloppy drive shipped, the Shugart Venture model SA300.

In 1988, Ensoniq introduced a successor to the Mirage with the more advanced EPS (Ensoniq Performance Sampler), and later the EPS-16+ and finally, the ASR-10. After the launch of the EPS in 1988, Ensoniq cut the price of the Mirage to $899, making it by far the least-expensive sampler then available.

== Features and architecture ==
The Mirage is an 8-bit sampler featuring eight voices of polyphony, 16 accessible oscillators (or 32-oscillator wavetable synthesis upon loading alternative operating system), analog resonant Curtis CEM3328 4-pole 24-dB/octave filters, a 61-key velocity-sensitive keyboard or else 2U rack-mount module case, multi-sampling (up to 16 samples across keyboard), multi-timbral operation, extensive MIDI implementation, a two-digit LED display, a 333-event sequencer. It has 128 KB of sample RAM (64 KB for each keyboard half), plus 16 KB system/sequencer RAM (totaling 144 KB), and it is not expandable. Sample rate is variable from 10 kHz to 33 kHz (up to 50 kHz with optional Ensoniq Input Sampling Filter) with available sample time ranging from 2 to 6.5 seconds accordingly (for each keyboard half).

It includes a built-in 3.5-inch SS/DD floppy disk drive, which is used to boot the operating system as well as to store samples and sequences. Each sample disk includes a copy of the operating system and can therefore be used as a boot disk (obviating dedicated boot disks).

Each disk stores six separate files of samples and up to eight sequences. The keyboard is pre-configured into two sections, each functioning as an independent instrument, with a movable split point. This makes it easy to have one sound for the right hand (an "Upper" sound) and another for the left (a "Lower" sound). However, the standard OS can not move samples between keyboard sections. Thus the diskette can save three Upper sounds and three Lower sounds. Ensoniq later released an alternative OS called MASOS (Mirage Advanced Sampling Operating System), which trades off performance features for editing features, including the ability to copy an Upper sound to a Lower sound, and vice versa.

Using a feature called multi-sampling, the Mirage is also capable of assigning multiple samples to different keys across its keyboard. Using this technique, the Mirage essentially turns into a polyphonic multi-timbral MIDI sound module complete with a velocity-sensitive keyboard that can be used to drive other MIDI sound modules as well its own sound engine.

Alternative 3rd-party operating systems which substantially change and expand the synthesis capability and utility of the Mirage were produced.

The Mirage sampler has a distinctive sound due its low-bitrate converters and analog CEM3328 filters. It can load alternative operating systems that expand its capabilities to a 32-digital-oscillator wavetable synthesizer with user-definable sampled wavetables.

== Models ==
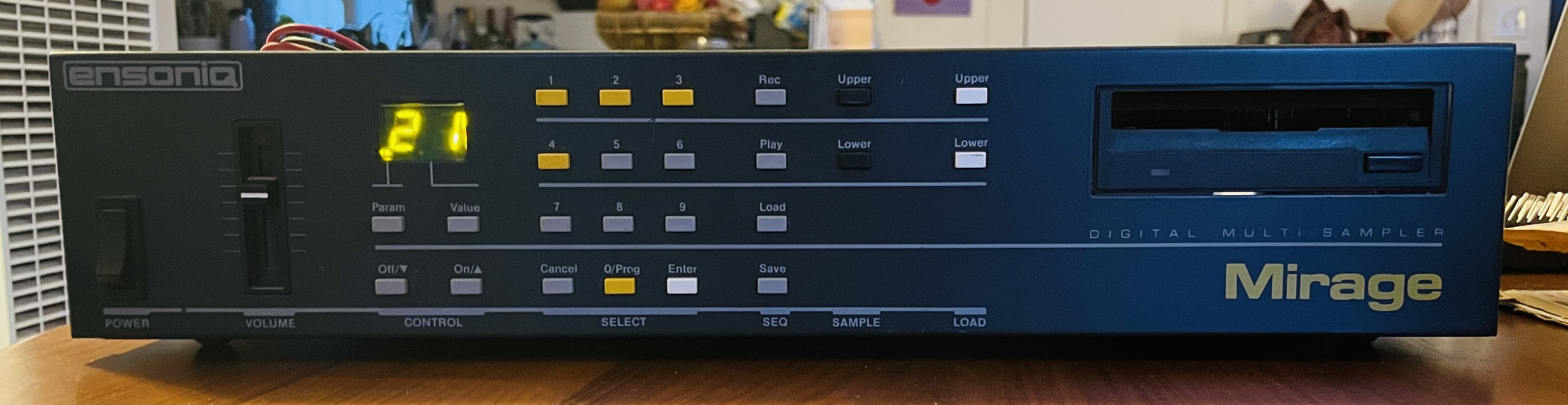
DMS-8 rack-mounted version

There are at least four keyboard versions of the Mirage.

The first Mirage (1984) had an all-metal case and endcaps, a keybed manufactured by Pratt-Reed, and large square black buttons.

Mirage DSK-8 (for Digital Sampling Keyboard, 8-voice) (1985) had small, gray, calculator-like buttons and a heavier-weighted-feel key-bed with polyphonic aftertouch. It also added the ability to send and receive MIDI program changes.

Mirage DSK-1 (1987) was shorter, housed in the same plastic case as later-produced Ensoniq ESQ-1 models, SQ-80, EPS, and other Ensoniq keyboards. The Mirage DSK-1 had a non-weighted keybed but added stereo outputs. The floppy disk drive, now with integrated recessed diskette holder, was repositioned above the modulation wheels. The DSK-1 did not include an expansion port, so the optional external Ensoniq Input Sampling Filter (and sequencer memory expansion) could not be installed. The Mirage DSK-1 sold for about $1300 USD.

A fourth concurrent version of the Mirage, also model DSK-8 but manufactured in Japan for the Asian and Australian markets, was similar to the original American DSK-8 except for its flat, seamless membrane panel over the front-panel switches (similar to an original Yamaha DX-7 and most microwave ovens) and the addition of a recessed diskette holder well in the right end of the front panel – the opposite side of the keyboard from the floppy disk drive (the disk drive being mounted exactly as the American DSK-8, at the front edge of the keyboard between the modulation wheels and the left end of the keybed). This Australasian DSK-8 variant included documentation in Japanese with English covers stating "Distributed by Nihon Hammond, Ltd."

In addition to the above versions, a concurrent European variant Mirage was manufactured in Italy and featured a faster disk drive than the American version.

A 2U-size rack-mount module version of the Mirage, model DMS-8 (for Digital Sampling Module) and later DMS-1 were also produced. The case color of these rack-mount Mirage modules was either dark gray/black or light gray.

== Notable users ==
Jimmy Jam and Terry Lewis used the Mirage extensively on the Janet Jackson albums Janet Jackson's Rhythm Nation 1814 and Control.

The Bomb Squad used the Mirage on Public Enemy's track "Rebel Without a Pause".

Le Tigre used the Mirage on their debut album and their track "Deceptacon".

OMD used the Mirage during mid-1980s live performances.
