= Ensoniq ES-5506 OTTO =

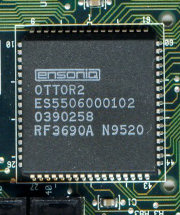
Ensoniq OTTO Synthesizer

The Ensoniq ES-5506 "OTTO" (also known internally within Ensoniq as the DOC IV) is a chip used in implementations of sample-based synthesis. Musical instruments and IBM PC compatible sound cards were the most popular applications.

OTTO is capable of altering the pitch and timbre of a digital recording and is capable of operating with up to 32 channels at once. Each channel can have several parameters altered, such as pitch, volume, waveform, and filtering. The chip is a VLSI device designed to be manufactured on a 1.5 micrometre double-metal CMOS process. It consists of approximately 80,000 transistors. It was part of the fourth generation of Ensoniq audio technology.

== Major features ==
- Real-time digital filters
- Frequency interpolation
- 32 independent voices
- Loop start and stop positions for each voice (bidirectional and reverse looping)
- Motorola 68000 compatibility for asynchronous bus communication
- Separate host and sound memory interface
- At least 18-bit accuracy
- 6-channel stereo serial communication port
- Programmable clocks for defining a serial protocol
- Internal volume multiplication and stereo panning
- ADC input for pots and wheels
- Hardware support for envelopes
- Support for dual OTTO systems
- Optional compressed data format for sample data
- Up to 16 MHz operation

== Implementations ==
- Taito Cybercore/F3 System
- Seta SSV System
- Ensoniq ASR-10/10R and ASR-88 synthesizers
- Ensoniq TS10/TS12 workstation synthesizers
- Ensoniq Soundscape S-2000
- Ensoniq Soundscape Elite
- Ensoniq SoundscapeDB daughterboard
- Westacott Organs DRE (Digital Rank Emulator)
- QRS Pianomation Chili and Sonata MIDI players 1998
- Boom Theory Corp 0.0 Drum Module Interface
