= Alpha Wave Movement =

- Genres: Ambient; New-age; Electronica; Space rock; Dub
- Years active: 1992–present
- Labels: Biome Music; Groove Unlimited; CUE; Silent Records; Waveform Records; Spiralight; Harmonic Resonance Recordings; Periphery; Anodize; Carpe Sonum
- Members: Gregory T. Kyryluk
- Website: MySpace page

Alpha Wave Movement (established in 1992 in Miami, Florida) is the electronic music project of Gregory T. Kyryluk. Alpha Wave Movement's musical style can be classified as ambient, new-age, some space rock, the classic 1970s German electronic music style known as Berlin school, as well as the ambient aesthetics of Brian Eno and Steve Roach. Releases such as A Distant Signal and Terra contain more ambient space elements compared to other Alpha Wave Movement works. Beyond Silence incorporates more space rock elements and features a more rhythmic feel in its overall musical compositions. In 2007, Alpha Wave Movement released The Mystic & The Machine, a musical exploration of 1970s romantic progressive rock performed on synthesizers, with the addition of UK musician Steve Hillman on electric guitar. The influences of Genesis, Ozric Tentacles (1980s era), and Camel are quite evident and intentional, showcasing yet another facet of Alpha Wave Movement's compositions. Alpha Wave Movement's music is semi-electronic, utilizing digital synthesizers and MIDI to create its sonic explorations.

In addition to musical influences, nature and natural landscapes serve as continuous sources of inspiration for compositions. Alpha Wave Movement has performed at Ambient Ping in Canada and at the Gathering Room in the USA. The project has released music on several labels, including Groove Unlimited (Netherlands), Silent Records (USA), Waveform Records (USA), Spiralight (USA), Anodize (USA), and the private label Harmonic Resonance Recordings. Alpha Wave Movement's other projects include Thought Guild (a vintage synthesizer improvisation project with synthesist Christopher Cameron), Open Canvas, Subtle Shift, Biome, and a solo release as Gregory Kyryluk.

The latest release from Alpha Wave Movement is titled "Soniq Variants" (2011). This release is conceptually based on the exclusive use of Ensoniq synthesizers for the compositions. Ensoniq was an American manufacturer that pioneered early affordable synthesizer workstations, the first of which was the ESQ-1 in 1986. Music on this release was primarily composed on the ESQ-1, VFX-SD, SQ-R, and DP4, all of which were made by Ensoniq. Additional use of a Novation synthesizer was also incorporated to enhance the timbral texture.

In 2012, Gregory Kyryluk launched a new electronic music project under the alias Subtle Shift (with early releases under the alias Within Reason). This new project delves deeply into ambient dub. It features a more sublime percussive foundation and environmental soundscapes, drawing on the influences of pioneering spirits from Detroit and Europe, such as Rod Modell, Yagya, and GAS, while also incorporating 1970s electro aesthetics. To date, there are four full-length releases by Subtle Shift on the Anodize and Harmonic Resonance Recording labels.

In 2014, the electronica world fusion project Open Canvas (essentially Gregory Kyryluk) featured a track from the Waveform Records release Indumani in the internationally popular gothic horror show True Blood. The Open Canvas track "Ojopati" was highlighted in the final season, episode 3.

== Discography ==
=== Full-length as Alpha Wave Movement ===
- 2023: Phase Intervals
- 2021: Infinite Realms
- 2019: Polyphasic Music
- 2018: Somnus
- 2018: Tranquility Space Volume 1
- 2017: Echoes in the Vacuum
- 2017: Cerulean Skies
- 2016: Kinetic
- 2015/16: Harmonic Currents
- 2015: Earthen
- 2015: System A
- 2014: Horizons
- 2014: Archaic Frontiers
- 2014: Celestial Chronicles
- 2013: Architexture of Silence
- 2013: Yasumu
- 2012: Exiled Particles - Archives Volume I
- 2012: Eolian Reflections
- 2011: Myriad Stars
- 2011: Soniq Variants
- 2009: Cosmic Mandala
- 2008: Terra
- 2007: The Mystic & The Machine
- 2007: The Regions Between
- 2005: Ephemeral Highways
- 2005: Beyond Silence
- 2003: Cosmology
- 2002: A Distant Signal
- 2000: Bislama
- 2000: Drifted into Deeper Lands
- 1998: Concept of Motion
- 1997: The Edge of Infinity
- 1995: Transcendence

=== Full-length as Biome ===
- 2021: Essence
- 2018: The Shores of Temenos

=== Full-length as Subtle Shift (formerly known as Within Reason) ===
- 2022: Somber Frequencies
- 2014: Farshadow
- 2013: Transient Broadcasts
- 2013: Substrate: Collected Elements
- 2012: Subtle Shift

=== Full-length as Thought Guild ===
- 2018: Archiphonic
- 2013: Electrik Curios
- 2012: Third Voyage
- 2005: Continuum
- 2002: Context

=== Full-length as Open Canvas ===
- 2014: Relics of the Sun (Dune Tunes 1997-1999)
- 2009: Travel by Sound
- 2000: Indumani
- 1998: Nomadic Impressions

=== Full-length as Gregory Kyryluk ===
- 2005: Ephemeral Highways

=== Compilations ===
- Die Welt ist Klang: A Tribute to Pete Namlook
- Ambienism
- From Here to Tranquility #4
- The Other World
- The Truth is Twisted
- Lektronic Soundscapes II
- Sequences Magazine Issue #26
- Sequences Magazine Anniversary Issue
- EMPortal: Joint Efforts the Album

=== Video Games ===
- Grand Theft Auto IV

=== Video ===
- Headcandy: Sidney's Psychedelic Adventure

=== Television ===
- True Blood, final season, episode 3: "Music from Open Canvas: 'Indumani'"
