= Bob Yannes =

American electronic engineer (born 1957)

Robert "Bob" Yannes (born 1957) is an American electronic engineer who designed the SID audio generator chip for the Commodore 64 and co-founded digital synthesizer company Ensoniq. He designed the Ensoniq 5503 Digital Oscillator Chip (DOC) which was used in both commercial synthesizers and the Apple IIGS home computer.

== Biography ==
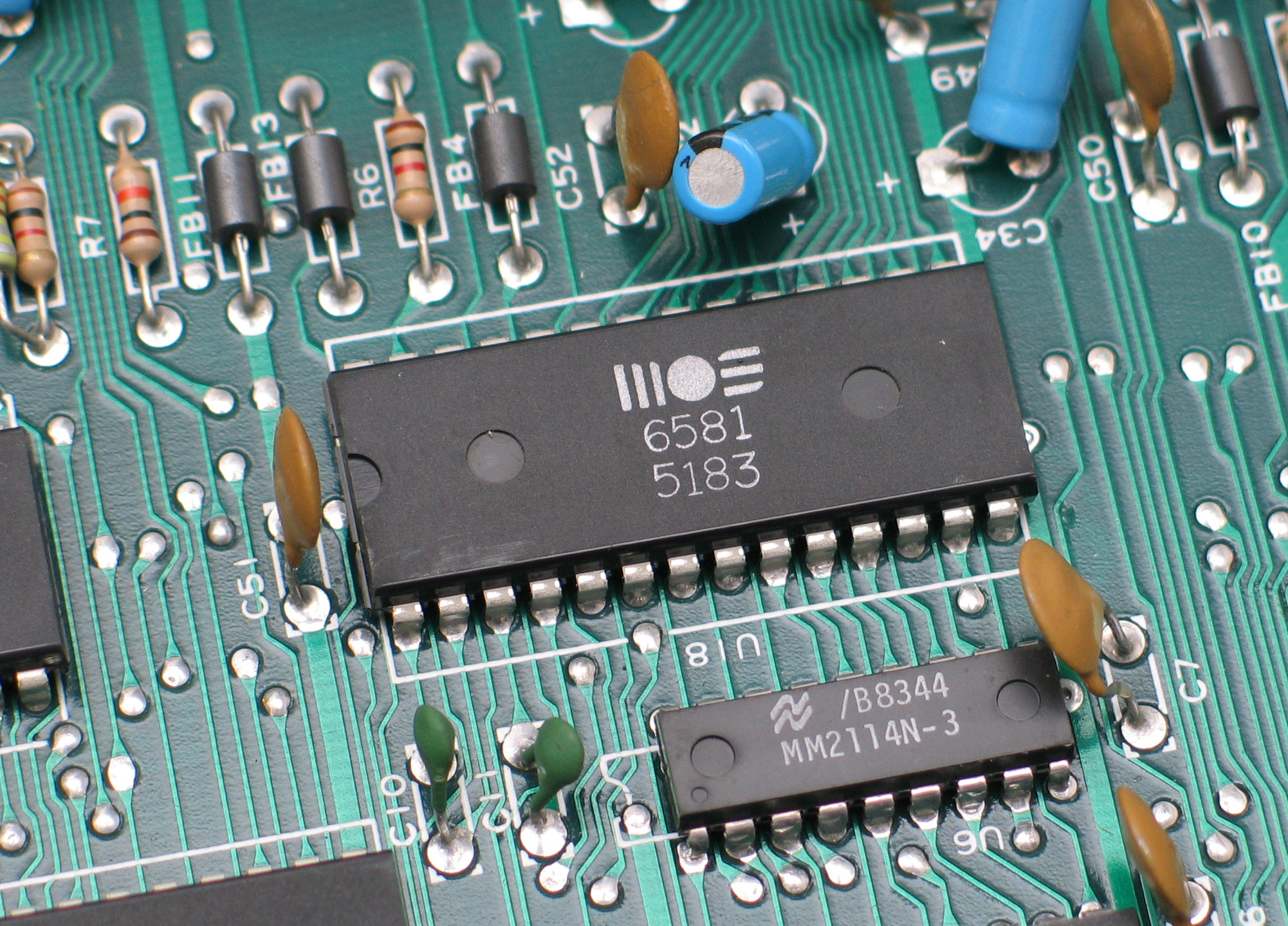
Commodore SID chip

Robert Yannes graduated from Villanova University in 1978. He started out as an electronic music hobbyist before being hired as a chip designer at MOS Technology which had become a part of Commodore. Albert Charpentier recruited Yannes partly for his music synthesis knowledge. He has been infatuated by electronic music since the early 1970s. He claims the song Lucky Man by Emerson, Lake & Palmer influenced him more than any other single song, and also lists Kraftwerk and Mike Oldfield among his influences.

He designed the MicroPET with help from Albert Charpentier which became an unintended prototype for the VIC-20 home computer.

He designed the single-chip sound synthesizer voice chip SID (6581) with enough resolution to produce high-quality music. However, he was unable to refine the signal-to-noise ratio which he desired. He hoped the chip would find its way into polyphonic/polytimbral synthesizers. The SID chip was his first attempt at a phase-accumulating oscillator, the heart of all Wavetable-lookup synthesis.

After he left MOS Technology he co-founded Ensoniq in 1982. The Ensoniq sound chips had multiplexed oscillators designed in such a way that it was possible to produce more voices per chip, typically 32 for Ensoniq's DOC, OTIS, and OTTO sound chips (48 for the final OTTO-48). Given less time constraints than for the SID chip design, a proper MOS op-amp could be implemented to eliminate signal leakage and an improved filter to achieve high resonance. Current designs include waveform interpolation, digital filters, and digital effects.
