= Sample-based synthesis =

Audio synthesis technique

Sample-based synthesis is a form of audio synthesis that can be contrasted to either subtractive synthesis or additive synthesis. The principal difference with sample-based synthesis is that the seed waveforms are sampled sounds or instruments instead of fundamental waveforms such as sine and saw waves used in other types of synthesis.

== History ==
Before digital recording became practical, instruments such as the Welte Lichttonorgel (1930s), phonogene (1950s) and the Mellotron (1960s) used analog optical disks or analog tape to play back sampled sounds.

Early sample-based instruments were the Computer Music Melodian, the Fairlight CMI and the New England Digital Synclavier. These instruments were expensive, up to $250,000.

More affordable sample-based synthesizers available for the masses with the introduction of the Ensoniq Mirage (1984), Roland D-50 (1987) and the Korg M1 (1988), which surfaced in the late eighties.

Sample-based synthesis is featured in sound cards for the multimedia PC, under the names such as wavetable card or wavetable daughterboard. (See Wavetable synthesis § Background)

== Advantages ==
The principal advantage of sample-based synthesis over other methods of digital synthesis, such as physical modelling synthesis or additive synthesis, is that processing power requirements are much lower. This is because most of the nuances of the sound models are contained in the prerecorded samples rather than calculated in real time.

In contrast to analog synthesizers, the circuitry does not have to be duplicated to allow more voices to be played at once. Therefore, the polyphony of sample-based machines is generally a lot higher. A mitigating factor is, however, that in order to include more detail, multiple samples might need to be played back at once (a trumpet might include a breath noise, a growl, and a looping soundwave used for continuous play). This reduces the polyphony again, as sample-based synthesizers rate their polyphony based on the number of multi-samples that can be played back simultaneously.

== Multisampling ==
A sample-based synthesizer's ability to reproduce the nuances of natural instruments is determined primarily by its library of sampled sounds. In the earlier days of sample-based synthesis, computer memory was expensive and samples had to be as short and as few as possible. This was achieved by looping a part of the sample, and then using a voltage-controlled amplifier and envelope generator combined with key velocity information to control the dynamics of the looped sound. In some cases, key velocity also modulates the attack time of the instrument, leading to a faster attack for loud passages.

As memory became cheaper, it became possible to use multisampling; instead of a single recording of an instrument being played back faster or slower to reproduce other pitches, the original instrument could be sampled at regular intervals to cover regions of several adjacent notes (splits) or for every note. This provides a more natural progression from the lower to the higher registers; lower notes don't sound dull, and higher notes don't sound unnaturally bright. It is also possible to sample the same note at several different levels of intensity, reflecting the fact that both volume and timbre change with playing style. For instance, when sampling a piano, three samples per key can be taken; soft, medium and with force. Every possible volume in between can be made by amplifying and blending the samples.

For sample-based models of instruments like the Rhodes piano, this multisampling is very important. The timbre of the Rhodes changes drastically from left to right on the keyboard, and it varies greatly depending on the force with which the key is struck. The lower registers bark, while the higher range has a more bell-like sound. The bark will be more distinct if the keys are struck with force. For the model to be sufficiently expressive, it is therefore necessary that multisamples be made across both pitch and force of playing.

== Sampling synthesizers ==
A more flexible sample-based synthesis design allowing the user to record arbitrary waveforms to form a sound's basic timbre is called a sampler. Early samplers were very expensive, and typically had low sample rates and bit depth, resulting in grainy and aliased sound. By the late 1990s, the huge increases in computer processor speed permitted the widespread development of software synthesizers and software samplers. The vast storage capacity of modern computers was ideally suited to sample-based synthesis, and many samplers have thus migrated to software implementations or been superseded by new software samplers.

== See also ==
- Rompler
- SoundFont
