= Panasonic CD interface =

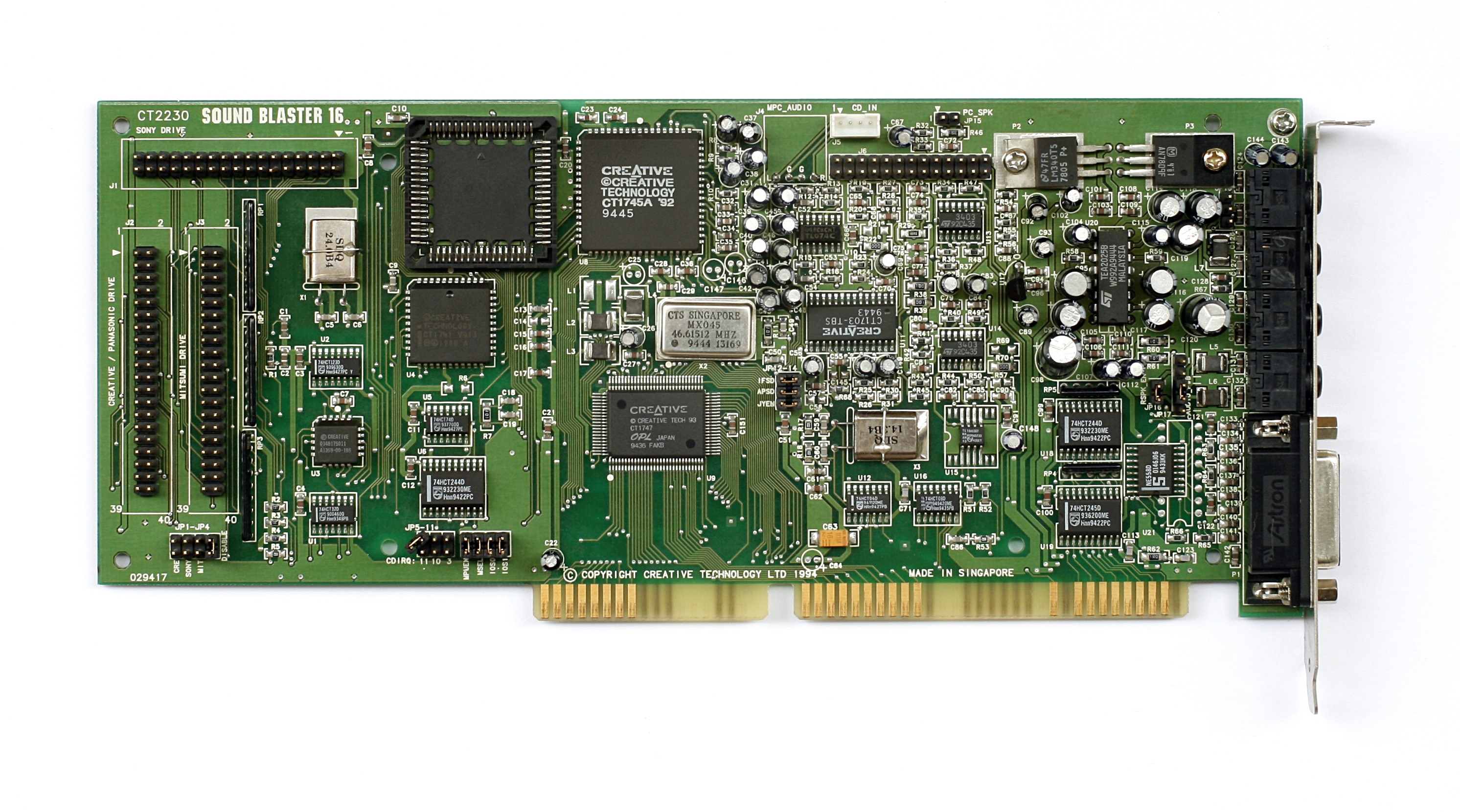
A SoundBlaster 16 with Panasonic CD interface on the left, in addition to a Mitsumi and a Sony CD interface

The Panasonic CD interface, also known as the MKE CD interface (for Matsushita Kotobuki Electronics), SLCD or simply Panasonic, is a proprietary computer interface for connecting a CD-ROM drive to an IBM PC compatible computer. It was used briefly in the early 1990s, and is no longer in production.

The interface is similar in physical format to an IDE, and an IDE cable may be used; however, the CD-ROM drive cannot be connected to the IDE bus and must have an interface card. Some SoundBlaster cards were manufactured with a port to connect to the CD-ROM drive with this interface.

FreeBSD supports this interface with "matcd" driver. Linux supports these drives via the sbcd, sbpcd or pcd drivers.
