= Multimedia PC =

Personal computer configuration standard

Official logo for the Multimedia PC standard

The Multimedia PC (MPC) is a recommended configuration for a personal computer (PC) with a CD-ROM drive. The standard was set and named by the Multimedia PC Marketing Council (MPMC), which was a working group of the Software Publishers Association (SPA, now the Software and Information Industry Association). The MPMC comprised companies including Microsoft, Creative Labs, Dell, Gateway, and Fujitsu. Any PC with the required standards could be called an "MPC" by licensing the use of the logo from the SPA.

== Background and reception ==
CD-ROM drives were just coming to market in 1990, and it was difficult to concisely communicate to a consumer all the hardware requirements for using "multimedia software", which mostly meant "displaying video synced with audio on a PC via a CD-ROM drive". The MPC standard was supposed to communicate this concisely, so a consumer buying hardware or software could simply look for the MPC logo and be assured of compatibility.

The MPC program had mixed results primarily because of the vast number of PCs sold under different brands, and once Windows became ubiquitous on PCs, specifying minimum or recommended Windows versions and features was often clearer to consumers than the MPC nomenclature. As the standardized term failed to catch on, and as the Software Publishers Association turned away from consumer software in the late 1990s, interest in the MPC standard vanished. The problem of software labeling continues, especially in the field of computer games, where a multitude of 3D video cards has been manufactured with an extremely wide range of capabilities, and no common industry labeling standard to let consumers know whether their card is powerful enough to run a particular game.

No further specification beyond MPC Level 3 in 1996 was published; the Multimedia PC Marketing Council dissolved not too long afterward.

== Levels ==
=== MPC Level 1 ===
The first MPC minimum standard, set in 1991, was:

- 16 MHz 386SX CPU
- 2 MB RAM
- 30 MB hard disk
- 256-color, 640×480 VGA video card
- 1× (single speed) CD-ROM drive using no more than 40% of CPU to read, with < 1 second seek time
- Sound card (Creative Sound Blaster recommended as closest available to standard at the time) outputting 22 kHz, 8-bit sound; and inputting 11 kHz, 8-bit sound
- Windows 3.0 with Multimedia Extensions.

=== MPC Level 2 ===
In 1993, an MPC Level 2 minimum standard was announced:

- 25 MHz 486SX CPU
- 4 MB RAM
- 160 MB hard disk
- 16-bit color, 640×480 VGA video card
- 2× (double speed) CD-ROM drive using no more than 40% of CPU to read at 1×, with < 400 ms seek time
- Sound card outputting 44 kHz, 16-bit CD quality sound.
- Windows 3.0 with Multimedia Extensions, or Windows 3.1.

=== MPC Level 3 ===
In 1996, MPC Level 3 was announced:

- 75 MHz Pentium CPU
- 8 MB RAM
- 540 MB hard disk
- Video system that can show 352×240 at 30 frames per second, 16-bit color
- MPEG-1 hardware or software video playback
- 4× CD-ROM drive using no more than 40% of CPU to read, with < 250 ms seek time
- Sound card outputting 44 kHz, 16-bit CD quality sound
- Windows 3.11 or Windows 95

== See also ==
- PC System Design Guide
- Windows Sound System
