= Sound Blaster Roar =

Sound Blaster Roar is a portable Bluetooth speaker manufactured by Creative Technology Ltd. The speaker was launched on 27 February 2014 at the IT Show 2014 in Singapore. It has two amplifiers - one for driving the low and medium frequency and the other for high frequency. There are five drivers in the speaker, one 2.5" woofer, two passive radiators and two front 1.5” high frequency drivers.

== Design and features ==
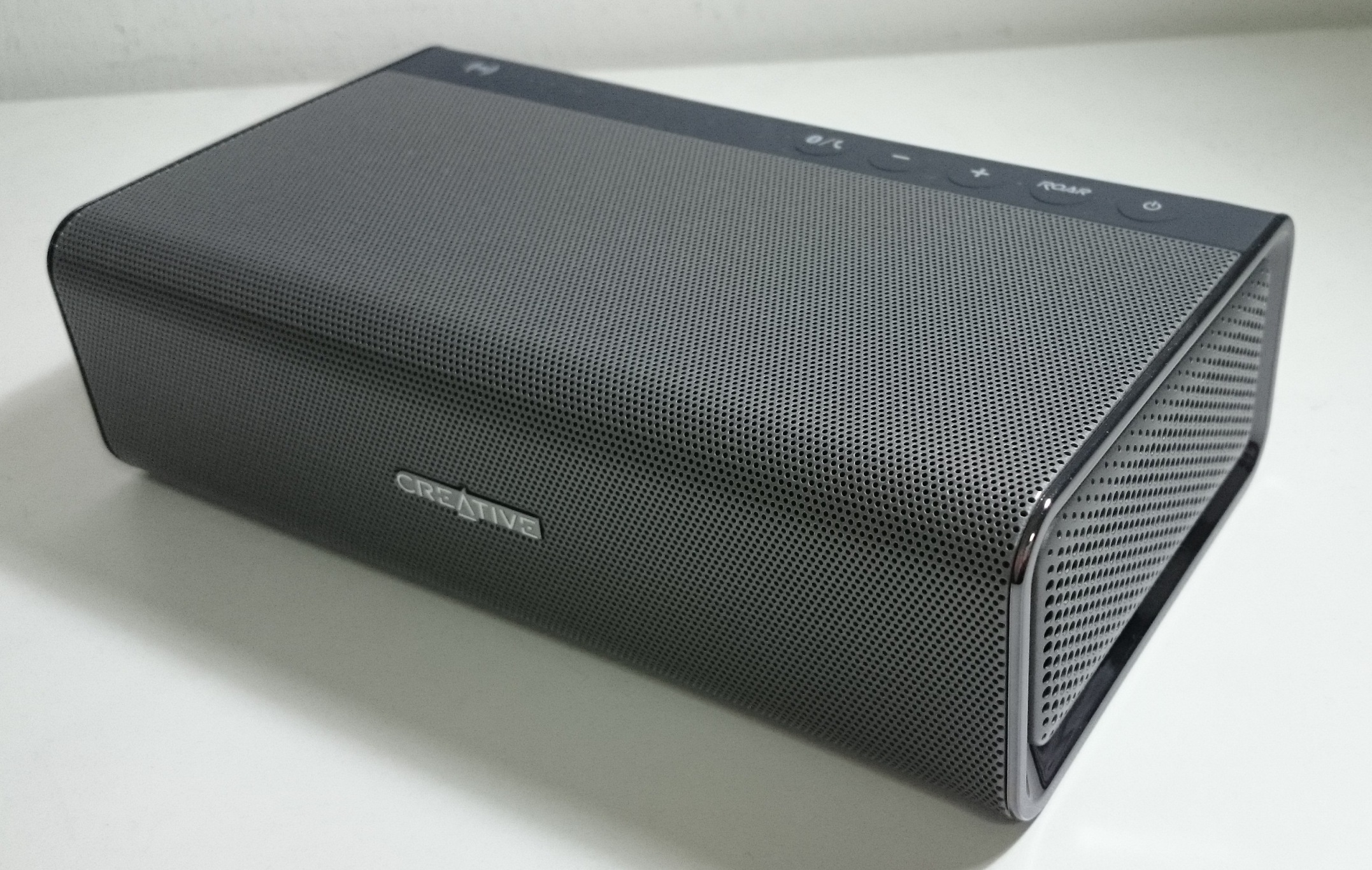
Sound Blaster Roar Photo Taken On My Desk

The Sound Blaster Roar is about the size of a dictionary and weighs 1.10 kg (2.5 lb). It supports aptX, AAC and SBC Bluetooth codecs. It can be used as a USB sound device on Mac and Windows computers. The supported operating systems are Mac OS X, Microsoft Windows 7, 8 and 8.1. When connected to a computer, SBX Pro Studio sound enhancements can be applied to the speaker with the Sound Blaster Control Panel software.

There are no SBX Pro Studio sound enhancements when it is connected via Bluetooth or Aux-In. The Sound Blaster Central app does not work with the Sound Blaster Roar.

The ‘ROAR’ button on top of the speaker when pushed will increase the loudness, depth and spaciousness of the audio. There is also a feature called TeraBass that increases the loudness in bass during low level playback. TeraBass increases the loudness of bass at low to medium levels and will decrease it when the master volume level increases until near or at maximum output.

Two Sound Blaster Roar speakers can be connected together via a MegaStereo cable to play in MegaStereo mode. In the MegaStereo mode, the left speaker will output the left channel and the right speaker will output the right channel.

There is a built-in microphone that allows it to be used as a speakerphone. The microphone can be used to record voices and mobile calls. However, the microphone cannot be used when the speaker is connected to a computer via USB. Sound Blaster claims the built-in battery has a capacity of 6000 mAh, but in reality it has two 3000 mAh cells connected in series, making the actual capacity 3000 mAh. The speaker supports a microSD card that allows for playback of MP3, WMA and WAV files.

== Sound Blaster Roar 2 ==
The Sound Blaster Roar 2 contains the same speaker drivers as the Sound Blaster Roar but is 20 percent smaller and 10 percent lighter than the Sound Blaster Roar. The left and right tweeters have been moved to the top of the speaker. The passive radiators are not covered by metal grills and can be seen pulsating. The speaker can be placed in both vertical and horizontal orientations.

=== Differences ===
The link security modes and mega stereo cable support are not available on the Sound Blaster Roar 2. The Roar button has been combined with the TeraBass button behind the speaker. There is a switch to toggle between USB Mass Storage mode and USB Audio mode.

The Sound Blaster Roar 2 cannot play audio while it is charged with a USB cable.

== Sound Blaster Roar Pro ==
The Sound Blaster Roar Pro is of the same size and weighs the same as the Sound Blaster Roar. The metal grills of the speaker are painted black.

There is a switch behind the speaker to switch between USB audio and USB Mass Storage modes. The Sound Blaster Roar Pro will remember the volume, Roar and TeraBass settings after powering off.

The maximum supported capacity for microSD card is 32 GB. The playback bit rate and sample rate on USB audio playback are 16 bit and 48 kHz respectively. The microphone of the speaker cannot be used when it is connected to a computer via USB.

=== Improvements over the Sound Blaster Roar ===
The drivers of the Sound Blaster Roar Pro have been improved. It supports the aptX Low Latency codec. It can play music up to 10 hours. The Sound Blaster Roar Pro also has got three equalizer profiles, warm, balanced and energetic for selection at the back of the speaker.

The Sound Blaster Roar Pro can be connected to the iRoar Mic wirelessly.
