= Sound Blaster X7 =

USB audio device

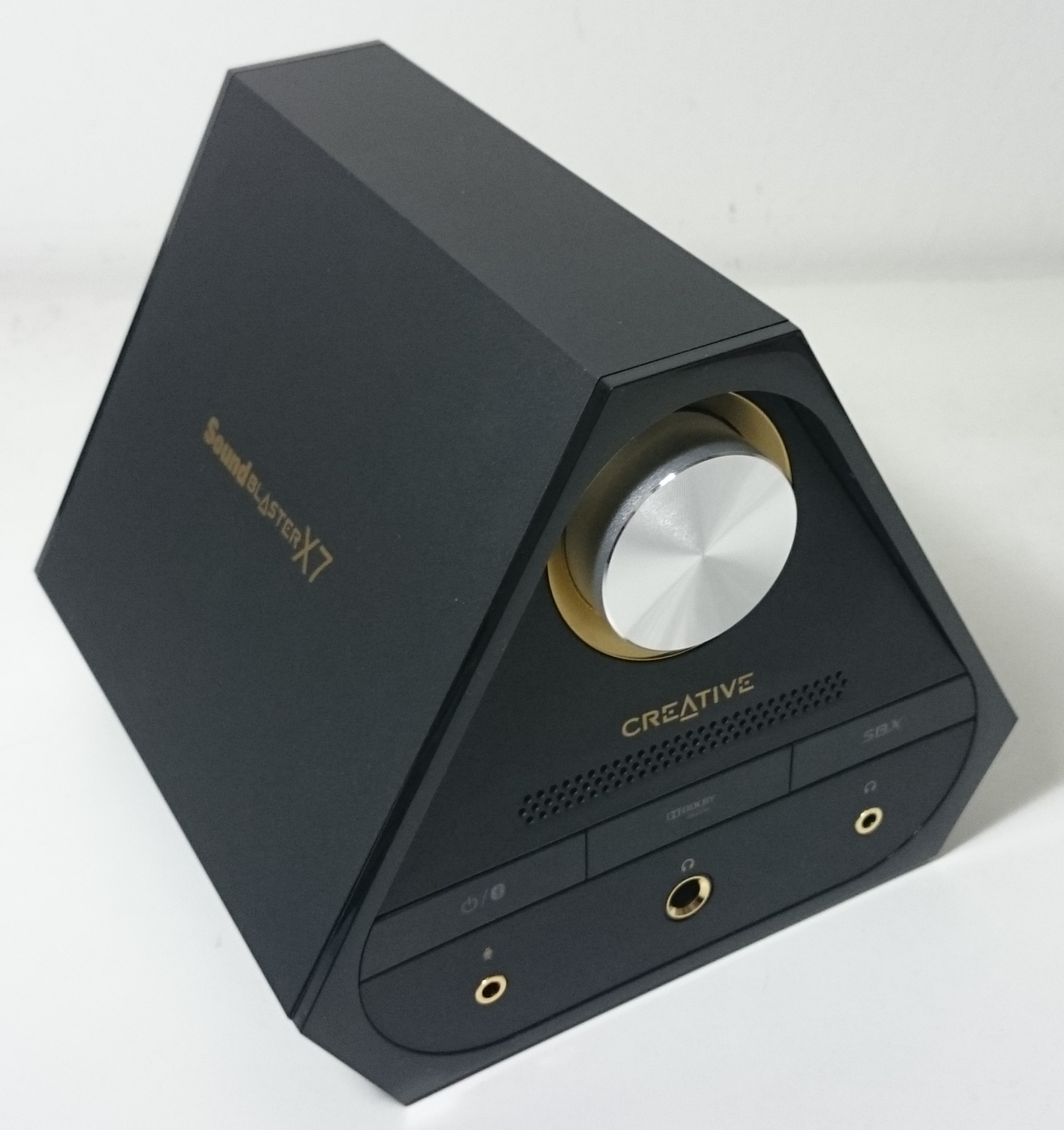
Sound Blaster X7

The Sound Blaster X7 is a USB audio device that can work without a computer. It was announced on 3 September 2014. It supports Microsoft Windows and Mac OS X computers but requires a power supply to work. The Sound Blaster X7 has the SB-Axx1 sound chip built-in. Android and iOS devices can change SBX Pro Studio audio settings with the Sound Blaster X7 Control app.

Settings are also saved into the X7 after changes are made with the Sound Blaster X7 Control app.

It is Creative Technology Limited's first USB audio device that supports stereo passive speakers. Like the Sound Blaster ZxR, it allows its op-amps to be swapped. The device does not have an encoder but can decode Dolby Digital 5.1 signals.

The Sound Blaster X7’s Bluetooth feature is only for receiving audio signals from Bluetooth devices, it can’t be used for transmitting audio signals to Bluetooth speakers and headphones. The Bluetooth codecs supported by the X7 are AAC, SBC, aptX and aptX Low Latency.

== Differences from the Sound Blaster Z Series ==
The Sound Blaster X7 does not have the ability to encode digital audio with Dolby Digital Live and DTS Connect.

It has a Dolby Digital decoder which was not found on the Sound Blaster Z series.

== System requirements ==
=== Microsoft Windows ===
- Intel® Core™2 Duo or AMD® equivalent processor (2.8 GHz or faster recommended)
- Intel, AMD or 100% compatible motherboard
- Microsoft® Windows® 8.1/8.0 32/64-bit, Windows 7 32/64-bit, Windows Vista® 32/64-bit SP1 or higher
- 1GB RAM
- >600 MB of free hard disk space
- Available USB 2.0/3.0 port (High Speed recommended with driver)

=== Macintosh ===
- Macintosh running Mac® OS X® 10.6.8 or higher
- 1GB RAM
- >600 MB of free hard disk space
- Available USB 2.0/3.0 port (High Speed recommended with software)

=== iOS ===
- iPhones/iPads running iOS 6.0 or higher and support Bluetooth 4.1 (Low Energy) or higher for Bluetooth connectivity
- iPhones/iPads running iOS 6.0 or higher for USB Host Audio streaming via Lightning Connector

=== Android ===
- Phones/Tablets running Android 2.3 or higher for Bluetooth connectivity
- Phones/Tablets running Android 4.1 or higher and support AOA2(Android Open Accessory 2.0) USB Streaming for USB Host Streaming

== Connectivity options ==
- USB 2.0 connection to PC / Mac
- USB Host connectivity to select iOS / Android models
- Optical S/PDIF-Input
- Bluetooth 4.1 Low Energy and Near Field Communication (NFC) for one-touch Bluetooth pairing
- RCA Line-In
- 3.5mm Mic-In
- 2-Way binding post terminal connectors for passive bookshelf and tower speakers
- 5.1 analog connectivity for surround sound
- Optical S/PDIF-Output
- 6.3mm headphone out
- 3.5mm headphone out

== Speakers and amplifiers ==
There is a switch behind the Sound Blaster X7 to switch modes between driving a pair of 4-ohms or 8-ohms passive speakers.

With its bundled 24V, 2.91A power adapter, it can deliver up to 27 watts per channel to 8-ohms passive speakers and up to 38 watts per channel to 4-ohms passive speakers.

With the optional 24V, 6A power adapter sold separately, it can drive 4-ohms passive speakers at up to 50 watts per channel.

== Built-in microphone ==
There are two beamforming microphones on the Sound Blaster X7's front panel.

== Sound Blaster X7 Limited Edition ==
The Sound Blaster X7 Limited Edition is white in color. It was unveiled on 6 January 2015. Its headphone amp output impedance is 1 ohm as compared to the Sound Blaster X7’s 2 ohms. It is also bundled with the higher power 24V, 6A power adapter.
